= Paula Gately Tillman =

American photographer

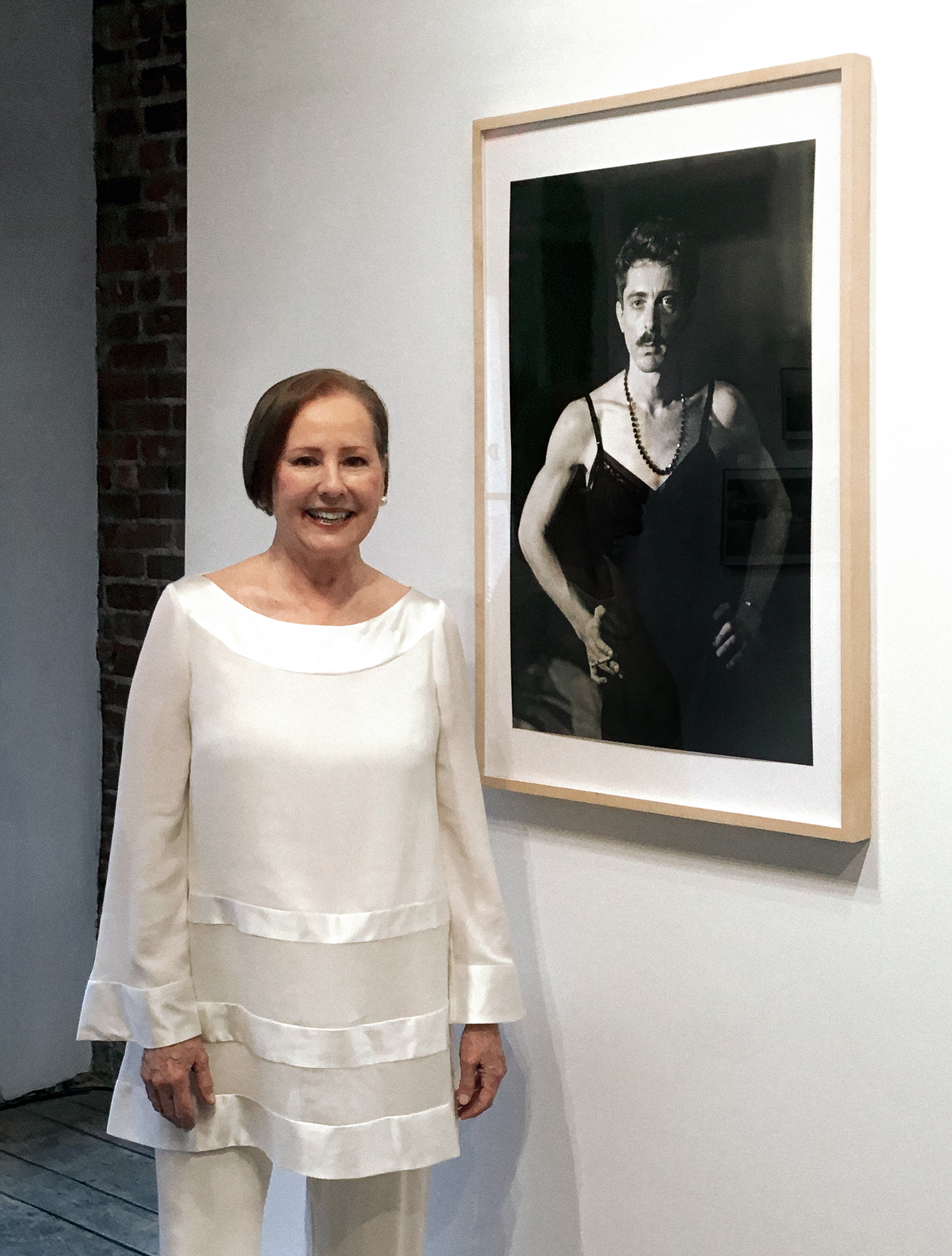
- Born: June 30, 1946 (age 80)
- Style: Photography
- Website: www.paulagatelytillman.com

Paula Gately Tillman (born June 30, 1946) is a photographer from Baltimore, Maryland best known for her 1980s and 1990s work documenting underground scenes and fringe personalities in New York and Atlanta.

Her work is held in the permanent collections of the Baltimore Museum of Art, New York University's Fales Library, the Stuart A. Rose Manuscript, Archives, and Rare Book Library at Emory University, and the Sheridan Libraries, Special Collections, Johns Hopkins University.

== Career ==
Gately Tillman studied photography in Aspen, Colorado under the guidance of photographer Eileen Lewis. She moved to New York to take classes at the School of Visual Arts and to pursue a career as a photographer. In 1984 a chance meeting with Brant Mewborn, senior editor of Rolling Stone, led to her introduction to the musicians, drag queens, fashion divas, and other collaborators that she would photograph. During her combined time in New York and Atlanta, her subjects included The American Music Show, RuPaul, Phoebe Legere, Michael Musto, Tish and Snooky Bellomo (Manic Panic), Lady Miss Kier, Wigstock, John Kelly, Lady Bunny, Nelson Sullivan, Joey Arias, Dick Richards (American Music Show), Fenton Bailey, Randy Barbato, Larry Tee and others.

In December 2018 Tillman released her first monograph, Fringe, New York and Atlanta, 1984 to 1997, that highlighted her photographic work from the 1980s and 1990s. Her book also includes a short memoir. Five of the photographs from Fringe, New York and Atlanta, 1984 to 1997 were curated into A Look Back: 50 Years After Stonewall, July 12–August 11, 2019, at Fort Gansevoort, a gallery located in a renovated building (which was Nelson Sullivan's personal residence in the 1980s) in the Meatpacking District in New York City.

From December 16, 2022 to January 21, 2023, Tillman exhibited a new body of work at the Creative Alliance in Baltimore, Maryland titled, New Generations: The Photography of Three Cities and Two Eras. The work showcased her continued dedication to capturing creative influencers and the cultural landscape in which they exist, through digital color portraits of 20 contemporary Baltimore artists in their studios, ephemera and select film portraits from New York and Atlanta in the 80s and 90s.

== Personal life ==
Tillman is the widow of LeRoy E. Hoffberger, attorney, art collector, author, and philanthropist.

== Collections ==
Tillman's work is held in the following permanent collections:

- Baltimore Museum of Art
- New York University's Fales Library
- The Stuart A. Rose Manuscript, Archives, and Rare Book Library at Emory University
- The Sheridan Libraries, Special Collections, Johns Hopkins University
