= The House of Hidden Meanings =

2024 memoir by RuPaul

- Author: RuPaul
- Language: English
- Genre: Memoir
- Publisher: Dey Street Books
- Publication date: March 5, 2024
- Publication place: United States
- ISBN: 9780063263901
- OCLC: 1388319009

The House of Hidden Meanings is a memoir by RuPaul. It is RuPaul's fourth book following Lettin' It All Hang Out (1995), Workin' It! (2010), and GuRu (2018). Upon release, it hit #1 on the New York Times best sellers list.
