= Kayvon Zand =

American performer and musician

- Genres: Electronic
- Occupations: Singer, performer, actor
- Years active: 2011–present
- Spouse: Anna Zand

Kayvon Zand, also known as Nadia Kayvon Zand, is an American nightlife personality and founder of Zandwagon, a model management and specialty casting company.

== Background ==
Zand was brought up in a single parent household by their mother.

== Nightlife ==
Zand is the "ringleader" of the Zand Collective, a performance group of a dozen members. In July 2010 they gained attention when their act was banned from the Highline Ballroom, as the venue deemed their act to be too shocking.

They were nominated for a Paper Magazine award in 2012, and they are known for throwing extravagant parties. Their dark, dance party, Dorian Gray, ran for the year of 2013, causing a controversy in the LES when the original venue for the party, the DL, came under fire from the local community board. The DL claimed they fired Zand because they were unaware they were throwing a dance party. Zand moved Dorian Gray to the Bowery Electric for its duration, and the party continued to receive favorable press.

In 2014 Zand began a new event called Sex Fifth Avenue. The first edition took place at the Museum of Sex, where it was successful in cementing Zand's reputation for revitalizing NYC nightlife. Zand proceeded to launch Kayvon Zand's Metropolis at Webster Hall across 2016–2017.

Zand has partnered with the Eventi Kimpton Hotels & Restaurants for a Halloween event in 2016. After taking 2020 off due to the COVID-19 pandemic, Zand's popular 849 party returned in 2021 with an Edward Gorey themed event titled Gorey 849.

== Music ==
Zand creates '80s inspired electronic dance music. Zand writes their own music, but work with producers including Chew Fu and Gomination to create the final tracks. Zand is a self-taught pianist, and also play the violin and viola.

Zand performed at the Life Ball in Vienna in 2011. Zand has also released two EPs; the One Way Flight remix package (2012) and Just Give It Away (2014). Zand was featured in Paper Magazine's music issue in 2012. Zand has created one music video for each of their EPs. One Way Flight and Just Give It Away were both directed by Mike Ruiz and have both received favorable press, being launched by Interview Magazine and Wild Magazine respectively. Zand headlined the Jersey City Pride festival in 2021 and in 2024 as a trans woman.

== Acting ==
Zand has been both a film and a stage actor. They played a terrorist in RuPaul's film Starrbooty, Elvis Presley on an episode of the popular Japanese show The World's Astonishing News and starred in Alfred Preisser and Randy Weiner's "Caligula Maximus-Featuring Kayvon Zand", produced by Stephen Pevner.

== Zandwagon ==
In June 2017, Zand launched "Zandwagon", a model management and specialty casting company.

== Personal life ==
In December 2024, Zand came out as nonbinary. Zand is married to Anna Zand, and has three children.
