= Dick Richards (producer) =

LGBT media producer (1946 - 2018)

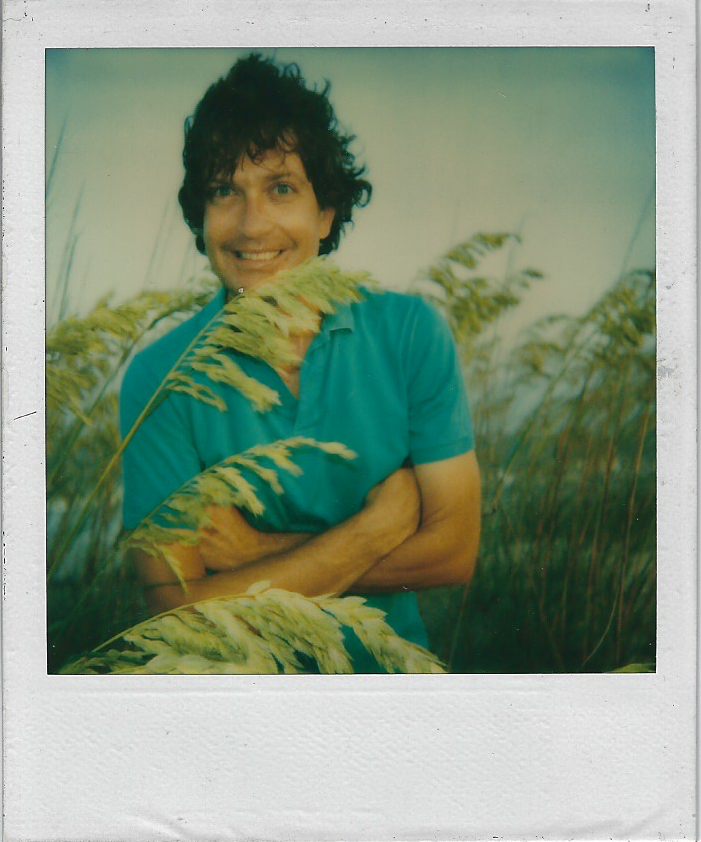
- Born: James Prioleau Richards III; November 15, 1946; Kershaw, South Carolina, U.S.
- Died: September 13, 2018 (aged 71); Port Orange, Florida, U.S.
- Occupations: Video artist, music producer, TV personality
- Years active: 1981–2018
- Spouse: John David Goldman (m. 2015)

James Prioleau "Dick" Richards III (November 15, 1946 – September 13, 2018) was an American video artist, music producer and TV personality. Richards co-hosted and co-produced The American Music Show on public access cable TV in Atlanta. The show's 25-year run (1981 to 2005) made it the longest-running public access show in the world, and it was where many LGBT entertainers, including RuPaul, made their TV debuts. Richards and business partner Ted Rubenstein produced RuPaul's first three recordings on their independent Funtone USA label.

Richards also is noted for having preserved the video collection of his artistic partner Nelson Sullivan, who recorded hundreds of hours of videotape in New York City's Downtown scene between 1983 and 1989, capturing such luminaries as RuPaul, Andy Warhol, Keith Haring, Sylvia Miles and Susanne Bartsch. In 2012, Richards, David Goldman and Robert Coddington donated the Nelson Sullivan Video Collection to the Fales Library & Special Collections at New York University. Edited versions of select tapes are on the YouTube channel 5NinthAvenueProject.

== Early life, education, and early career ==
Dick Richards was born on November 15, 1946, in Kershaw, South Carolina, to James Prioleau Richards II (1902–1992) and Henrietta Edwards Richards (1906–1996). Dick's father Prioleau was the long-time superintendent of schools for Lancaster County, S.C. The extended family includes politicians John Gardiner Richards Jr. and James Prioleau Richards. In an interview with writer John Sanchez, Dick Richards described his early years in Kershaw and his friendship with Nelson Sullivan: "Nelson and I were best friends from the age of five on. As a lonely, only child myself, when my family moved next door to Nelson's and I found out Nelson was going to be my playmate, that was one of the happiest days of my life." Growing up, both boys were well-read -- Auntie Mame was an influential favorite -- and frequently enjoyed movies at the town's one cinema.

Dick Richards attended Davidson College, along with Nelson, and he graduated in 1969 with a Political science degree. In 1970, Sullivan moved to New York City, while Richards moved to Atlanta. A conscientious objector who vehemently opposed the Vietnam War, Richards fulfilled his alternative service requirement in part by working at the Atlanta Girls Club. In 1972, Richards was a full-time volunteer on the George McGovern presidential campaign. He met activists and politics-minded people he admired including Maynard Jackson, as well as "Julian Bond, John Lewis, Andrew Young and many others who pushed Atlanta toward its bright future."

With the intent of becoming a Presbyterian minister, he attended Columbia Theological Seminary in Decatur, Georgia. He later earned a Master's in Business Administration from Georgia State University. Richards acquired a Class 1 radio operator's license and worked for a time at Atlanta radio station WERD.

== The American Music Show ==
In 1981, Atlanta City Council Member James Bond approached Richards about reviving their cancelled community radio show (from station WRFG) as a public access TV show. (The radio program had ended because Richards and Bond "got thrown off for playing a Donna Summer record." Richards later recalled, "We never could learn how to work the volume controls or cue up a record properly, but playing a disco song was beyond the pale.")

The American Music Show was videotaped in Bond's bedroom at his mother's home using his Panasonic camera and VHS recorder. Bond's then-girlfriend, Potsy Duncan, ran the camera.In an interview with Carolyn Rivera, Richards said: "We decided it would be televised live-on-tape from James' mother's basement (so we could have proper refreshments and not be bothered by grown-ups) with no editing, and it would be a talk/variety show, and the only guests we would invite would be people we knew."

In his 2018 obituary of Richards, Matthew Terrell wrote that "at the time, public access television was well-known as a bastion for new, experimental, and wide-ranging voices (kind of making it the YouTube of the '80s and '90s), and The American Music Show showcased alt-Atlanta in a way it had never been portrayed. This show, which Richards produced on a weekly budget of $5 (the cost of the tape to record it on), took viewers into underground drag performances, on tours of gay cruising trails in public areas, to tacky psychedelic trailer parks with bizarre singing sisters, and to rural Georgia, where a 24-year-old RuPaul protested the real-life KKK."

In his autobiography Lettin It All Hang Out," RuPaul wrote "When I saw [Richards and Bond] on public access I thought, 'That's where I belong.'"

Also for public access TV, Richards produced a spinoff of The American Music Show called DeAundra Peek's Teenage Music Club. In it, Rosser Shymanski portrayed an ebullient and heavily made-up teenage resident of a Georgia trailer park. Selections from DeAundra Peek's Teenage Music Club may be viewed on the YouTube channel MisterRichardson.

== Funtone USA ==
In 1984, Dick Richards and housemate Ted Rubenstein co-founded the independent record label Funtone USA. During the 1980s, Funtone USA released 19 recordings, including three by RuPaul ("Sex Freak," "RuPaul Is Star Booty, Original Motion Picture Soundtrack," and the single "Ping Ting Ting," as well as recordings by Larry Tee, Phoebe Legere, Cocktail Girlz, and The Fabulous Pop Tarts (comprising RuPaul's Drag Race producers Fenton Bailey and Randy Barbato).

== Videography ==
Dick Richards archived more than 600 videotapes that were shot by his longtime friend, Nelson Sullivan, who died July 4, 1989 of an apparent heart attack. Shortly after Richards attended Sullivan's graveside service in Kershaw, South Carolina, he flew to New York and retrieved Sullivan's archive, which included extensive footage of Downtown New York City culture featuring RuPaul, Andy Warhol, Keith Haring, Sylvia Miles and Susanne Bartsch. From then until his own death in 2018, Richards and Robert Coddington catalogued the videos and edited versions of them for posting on YouTube. They donated the archive to the Fales Library.

== Personal life ==
In 1981, Richards met John David Goldman, who had recently relocated to Atlanta from Greenwood, South Carolina, to pursue a career in journalism, and the two began a relationship. In 1988, Goldman moved into the Candler Park home that Richards and Rubenstein co-owned and shared. In 1994, Richards and Goldman moved to the Inman Park home formerly owned by Potsy Duncan. Though Goldman said his chief contribution to The American Music Show was "keeping the cocktails coming," he also performed on the show, most notably as the boozy "limousine liberal" Betty Jack DeVine.

Richards and Goldman purchased a house in Daytona Beach, Florida, in November 2004. Shortly before he left Atlanta for the summer of 2005, The American Music Show cast recorded what became their final show. After returning to Atlanta, Richards was diagnosed with leukemia in December 2005. In 2013, Richards and Goldman sold their Atlanta home and relocated to the Daytona Beach house, which they had nicknamed "Monkey Island." The pair were married on August 7, 2015, at City Island Courthouse in Daytona Beach.

Richards died on September 13, 2018, at Halifax Hospice in Port Orange, with Goldman by his side. As Richards requested, his ashes were buried near the grave of the couple's dog Sashay ("Baby").

== Legacy ==
On May 12, 2007, Richards launched the YouTube channel MisterRichardson, which showcases a selection of videos by Richards and others, in particular excerpts from The American Music Show. He also created the channel 5NinthAvenueProject, which highlights Nelson Sullivan's videos. Richards created a series of websites: Funtone.com, which documents the independent recording company he created with Ted Rubenstein; BettyJack.com hosted by Betty Jack DeVine of The American Music Show; NelsonSullivan.com, a tribute to Sullivan and his videos; and Gaytona.com, a humorous look at NASCAR racing, which he created with David Goldman. Per Richards' request, all these media are maintained as they were at his death in 2018.

In 2013, Richards, Goldman and Potsy Duncan donated The American Music Show video recordings to the Emory University Libraries. In 2018, Richards and Goldman donated the Dick Richards Audiovisual Recordings to the Rose Library.

Richards' work for The American Music Show has been honored with videos, performances, and writing. Upon winning his first Emmy Award for RuPaul's Drag Race just days after Richards' death, RuPaul opened his acceptance speech by expressing his thanks to Richards. World of Wonder's WOW Report called Richards "the genius behind the iconic Atlanta-based Funtone Records and a champion of all that we do and have done over the past 30 years."

In his final interview, Richards was asked by Atlanta journalist Matthew Terrell to comment on his legacy. "My legacy is somehow managing to keep two video collections intact for 30 years and then, through the effort of others, getting both those collections into important college archives so the people of the future can look at them and say, 'What on earth were those people doing?'"
