= GuRu =

Autobiography and life guide from American drag queen RuPaul

- First edition
- Author: RuPaul
- Subject: autobiography, advice
- Genre: autobiography / self-help
- Publisher: Dey St. Books
- Publication date: October 2018
- Publication place: United States
- Pages: 194
- ISBN: 0062862995
- Preceded by: Workin' It! RuPaul's Guide to Life, Liberty, and the Pursuit of Style (2010)

GuRu is a 2018 autobiography and life guide from American drag queen and entrepreneur RuPaul. Released in October 2018 by HarperCollins, with a foreword by actress and author Jane Fonda, included are quotes, phrases, advice and insight to help readers navigate the "chaos of modern life", such as self-love, harnessing one’s inner critic, and finding your tribe. Her previous books were Lettin' It All Hang Out (1995), an autobiography, and Workin' It! RuPaul's Guide to Life, Liberty, and the Pursuit of Style (2010).

She was inspired to write the book to reach LGBTQ youth who often face ostracism and rejection from their parents and families, and society, because of their sexuality and gender identity. RuPaul’s parents divorced when she was very young and the experience scarred her for years, during which she had to grow through the pain. In an interview with WBUR, RuPaul notes the reason she wrote the book was to give young LGBTQ people a touchstone for their lives. She explained that the queens who competed in RuPaul's Drag Race have similar family experiences of rejection, and talked about those stories inspiring the viewers in dealing with their own problems. RuPaul sees LGBTQ people allegorically as lotus flowers growing through adversity; born under mud, growing through water, and then to reach air and the light of the sun. (Note: The growth is identified with human life, born in earth but desiring elevation to the air; representing the middle stage between animals and the ultimate reality. White Lotus Day is an annual celebration commemorating the story.)

== See also ==
- Performativity
- Social construction of gender
