= Dangerous Liaisons (2005 film) =

2005 American pornographic film

- DVD cover
- Directed by: Michael Lucas
- Written by: Tony Dimarco
- Based on: Les Liaisons dangereuses by Pierre Choderlos de Laclos
- Starring: Gus Mattox; Owen Hawk; Michael Lucas; Bruce Beckham; Kent Larson; Wilfried Knight; Frankie; Mario Ortiz; J. Blair Ross
- Cinematography: Tony Dimarco
- Edited by: Tony Dimarco
- Music by: Szechuan Fire
- Distributed by: Lucas Distribution
- Release date: 2005
- Running time: 163 minutes
- Country: United States
- Language: English

Dangerous Liaisons is a 2005 gay pornographic film directed by Michael Lucas and released by Lucas Entertainment. The film is a film adaptation of Les Liaisons dangereuses, a novel written in 1782 by Pierre Choderlos de Laclos. Set in the fashion industry of modern-day New York City, Lucas inserted pornographic scenes into the common themes of lust and deceit for the plot of his X-rated version.

A documentary of the film, More Dangerous: The Making of Michael Lucas' Dangerous Liaisons, premiered at the 2006 Philadelphia International Gay & Lesbian Film Festival on July 22, 2006.

== Plot ==
Michael Lucas plays Marcus Von Halpern, head of a New York fashion empire with a manipulative side, who enlists the help of Valentine Moore, played by Gus Mattox. Von Halpern wants Moore, a world-renowned photographer and "player", to seduce Sebastian Lacroix (Wilfried Knight), the new lover of Von Halpern's ex-boyfriend, Tom Mercedes (Kent Larson). Moore agrees on one condition: he gets a night with Von Halpern as his reward.

Lacroix receives a call from his modeling agent informing him that he's booked for a photo-shoot with Moore. His boyfriend, Mercedes, warns Lacroix about Moore's reputation and advises him that Moore is not trustworthy. This segues into the first sex scene of the film, with Lacroix and Mercedes each topping the other in a flip-flop encounter.

In the following scene, Mercedes is seduced by his employee Matt Cody (Owen Hawk). They engage in sexual activity on the conference table in the boardroom when the cleaning guy (Mario Ortiz) shows up and joins in.

Meanwhile, Moore sets up his photography session with Lacroix and engages another model, J., to seduce Lacroix. Lacroix is later guilt-ridden.

Cody meets with Von Halpern, who wants to solicit information about Cody's boss, Von Halpern's ex-boyfriend, Mercedes. Another sex scene ensues. Von Halpern's current boyfriend Bobby (Bruce Beckham) discovers Von Halpern's infidelity and seduces Moore to get even. Since Von Halpern has reneged on his payment to Moore in the form of a night together, Moore responds favorably to Bobby's advances.

The cameo appearances occur during the final scene, set as the opening night of Moore's new gallery exhibit. There is an additional plot twist as a main character is murdered at the end.

== Cast and characters ==
Main characters

- Gus Mattox – Valentine Moore
- Owen Hawk – Matt Cody
- Michael Lucas – Marcus Von Halpern
- Bruce Beckham – Bobby
- Kent Larson – Tom Mercedes
- Wilfried Knight – Sebastian Laqioux
- Frankie – Delivery Guy
- Kymberley Nevison - Secretary
- Mario Ortiz – The Cleaning Guy
- J. – Mack
- Blair Ross – Marina

Celebrity cameos

- Boy George
- Lady Bunny
- Amanda Lepore
- Hedda Lettuce
- Michael Musto
- Graham Norton
- RuPaul
- Bruce Vilanch
- Matthew Mariani

== Awards ==
The film received thirteen 2006 GayVN Awards nominations and won four: Best Picture (tie), Best DVD Extras/Special Edition, Best Screenplay, and Best Supporting Actor for the performance of Kent Larson. The film tied for the 2006 GayVN Award for Best Picture with Rascal Video's Wrong Side of the Tracks Part One and Part Two, directed by Chi Chi LaRue.

The 2006 Adult Erotic Gay Video Awards, commonly referred to as the "Grabbys," Dangerous Liaisons received nine nominations with one award to Gus Mattox for Best Actor.
