= Clinton AME Zion Church =

Historic church in South Carolina, United States

- U.S. National Register of Historic Places
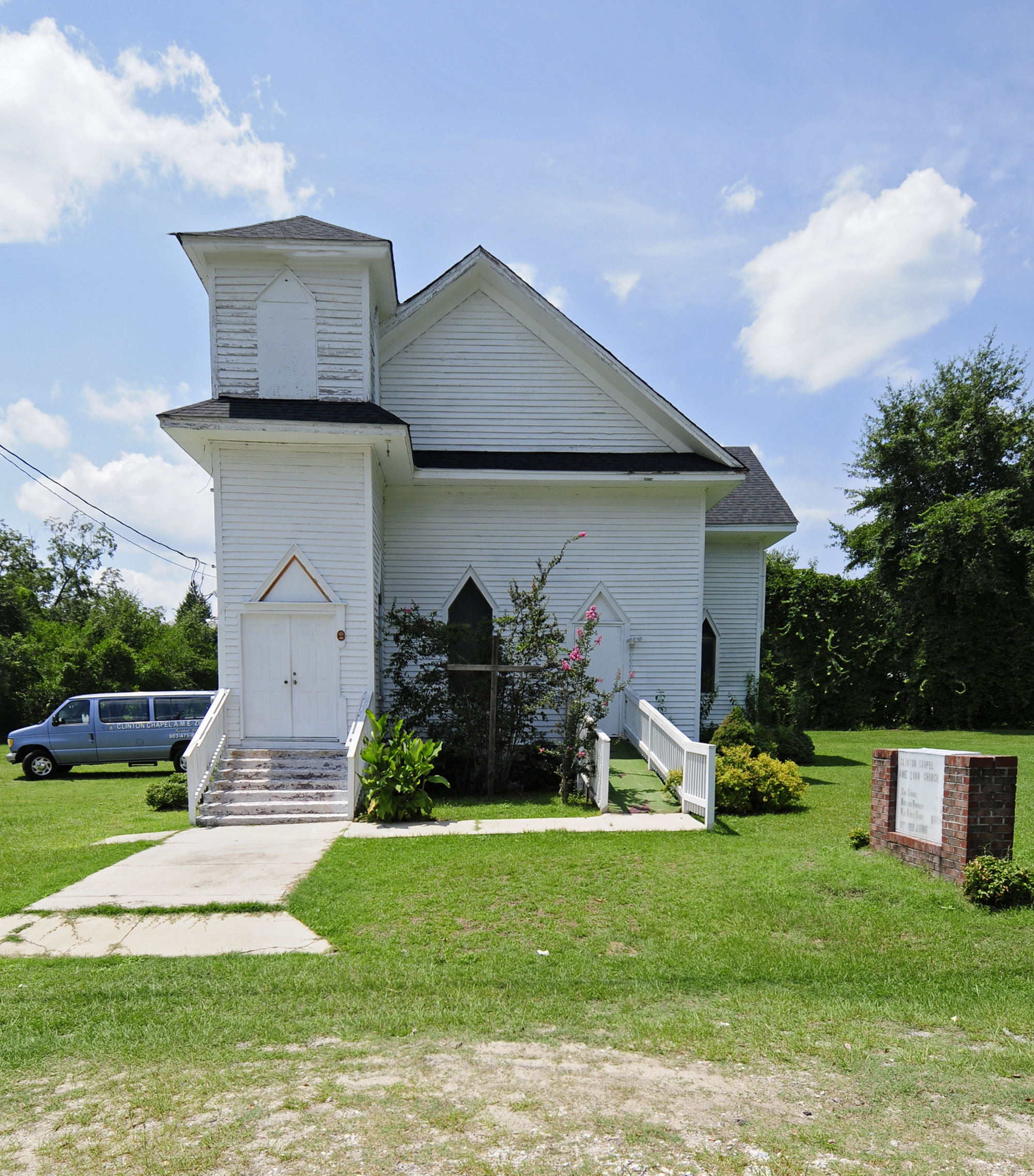
- Clinton AME Zion Church, August 2012

- Location within South Carolina Location within the United States
- Location: Johnson St., Kershaw, South Carolina
- Coordinates: 34°32′52″N 80°35′12″W
- Area: less than one acre
- Built: 1909
- Architectural style: Gothic
- MPS: Lancaster County MPS
- NRHP reference No.: 90000092
- Added to NRHP: February 16, 1990

Clinton AME Zion Church is a historic African Methodist Episcopal church located on Johnson Street between Marion and Richland Streets in Kershaw, Lancaster County, South Carolina. It was built in 1909, and is a one-story, T-shaped, Gothic Revival style frame structure covered with clapboard siding and has a brick pier foundation with concrete block infill. It was the first separate black church established in Kershaw in the early 20th century.

It was added to the National Register of Historic Places in 1990.
