= Dr. William Columbus Cauthen House =

Historic house in South Carolina, United States

- U.S. National Register of Historic Places
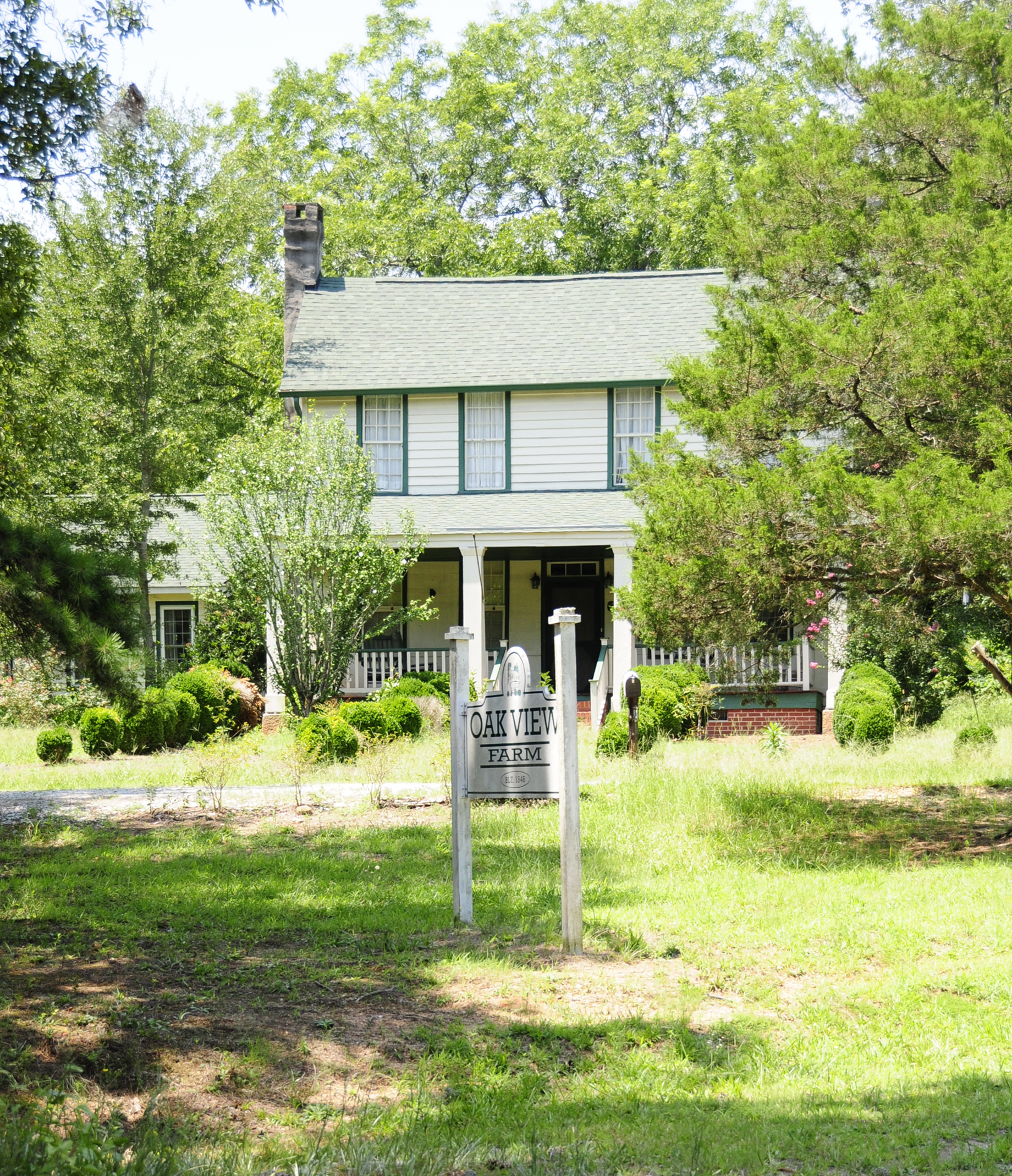
- William Columbus Cauthen House, August 2012

- Location within South Carolina Location within the United States
- Location: South Carolina Highway 75, near Kershaw, South Carolina
- Coordinates: 34°33′19″N 80°38′30″W
- Area: 4.5 acres (1.8 ha)
- Built: c. 1848
- Architectural style: Central-hall farmhouse
- NRHP reference No.: 82003872
- Added to NRHP: June 28, 1982

Dr. William Columbus Cauthen House, also known as Oak View Farm, is a historic home located near Kershaw, Lancaster County, South Carolina. It was built about 1848, and is a two-story, frame, weatherboarded, central-hall farmhouse, or I-house. Also on the property are a log barn and a frame barn and shed. It is the oldest known residence in Lancaster County and was the home of Dr. William Columbus Cauthen, who was involved in state politics.

It was added to the National Register of Historic Places in 1982.
