= Tom Judson =

American composer, actor and adult film star

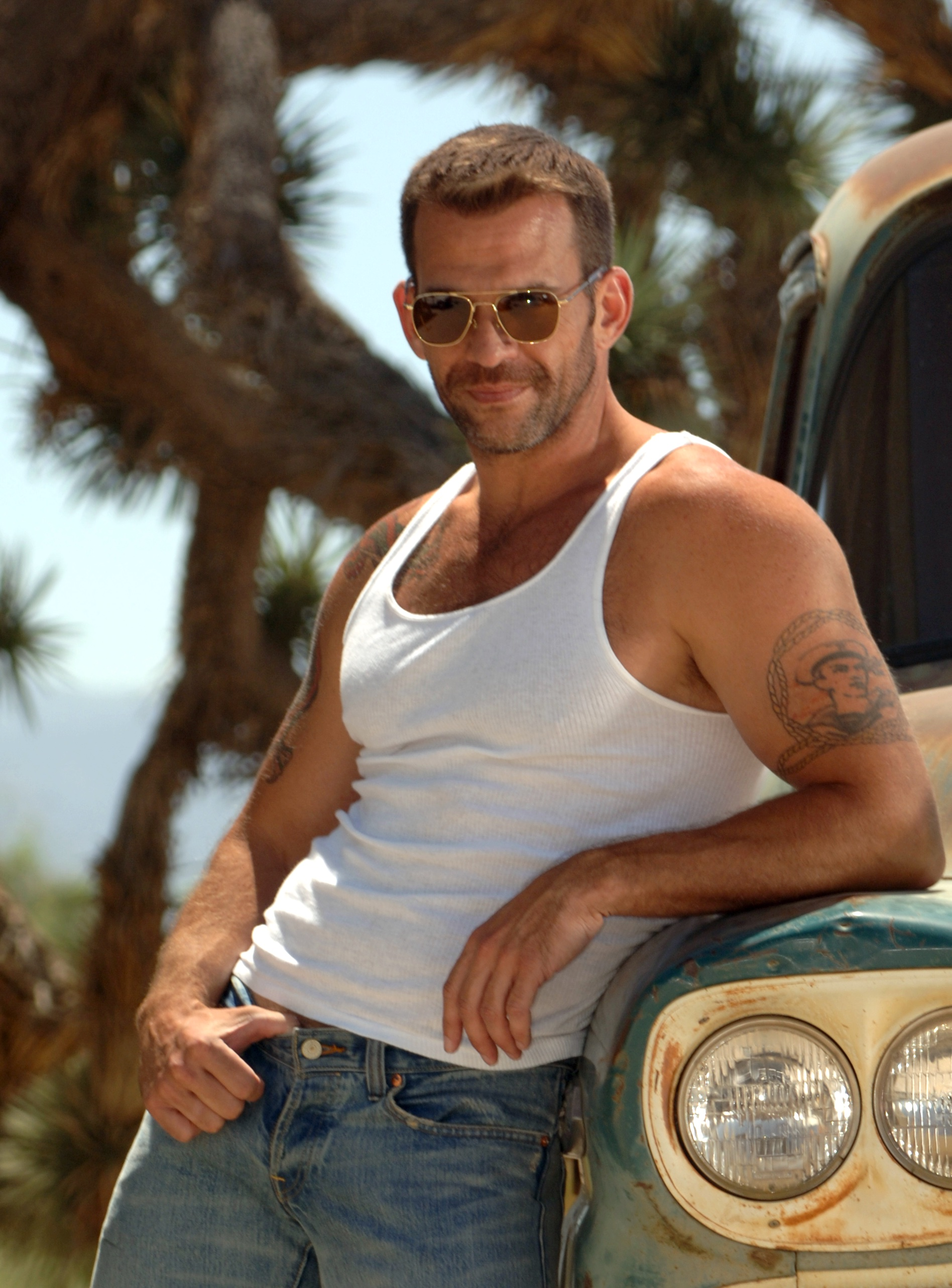
- Judson in 2005
- Born: November 14, 1960 (age 65); Goshen, New York, U.S.
- Other name: Gus Mattox
- Occupations: Theater actor, composer and adult film star
- Height: 6 ft 0 in (1.83 m)

Thomas R. Judson (born November 14, 1960) is an American musical theatre actor and composer, particularly for off-Broadway plays (including Vampire Lesbians of Sodom and White Cotton Sheets), and a retired pornographic film actor. His credits include writing music for the films Metropolitan, Good Money and The Incredibly True Adventure of Two Girls in Love, as well as performing on Broadway and in national stage tours of the musicals 42nd Street and Cabaret.

In 2003, he embarked on a gay pornographic career under the stage name of Gus Mattox. He retired from the pornography industry in 2006 to concentrate on his career as an actor and musician, and was promptly cast in the world premiere of Terrence McNally's Some Men. As Mattox, he received the 2006 GayVN Awards Performer of the Year Award for his work in the industry. His final role under the stage name Gus Mattox was as RuPaul's leading man in Starrbooty.

In the early 2000's, Judson briefly dabbled in house flipping in the Hudson Valley, a project that ended with the 2008 collapse of the housing market. Judson's real estate work garnered coverage in The New York Times.

Judson wrote and performed his autobiographical one-man show Canned Ham from 2009 to 2011. Much of the material from that show, and from his Huffington Post column, was collected into his book of essays Laid Bare. Since 2011 Judson has continued performing his own cabaret act and has served as musical director and Second Banana for Charles Busch's cabaret act.

in 2017 he launched a successful Etsy t-shirt shop which reproduces poster art from flop Broadway shows, as well as signage from classic films.

He is a committed vegan and atheist.

== Selected videography (as Gus Mattox) ==
List of films
Brooklyn Meat Company, 1999
FiveStar, 2003
Bolt, 2004
Bootstrap, 2005
Dangerous Liaisons, 2005
Big Rig, 2006
Starrbooty, 2007

== See also ==
- List of male performers in gay porn films

Awards
Preceded by Tag Adams	GayVN Awards for Performer of the Year; 2006	Succeeded by François Sagat
