= Unity Baptist Church =

Historic church in South Carolina, United States

- U.S. National Register of Historic Places
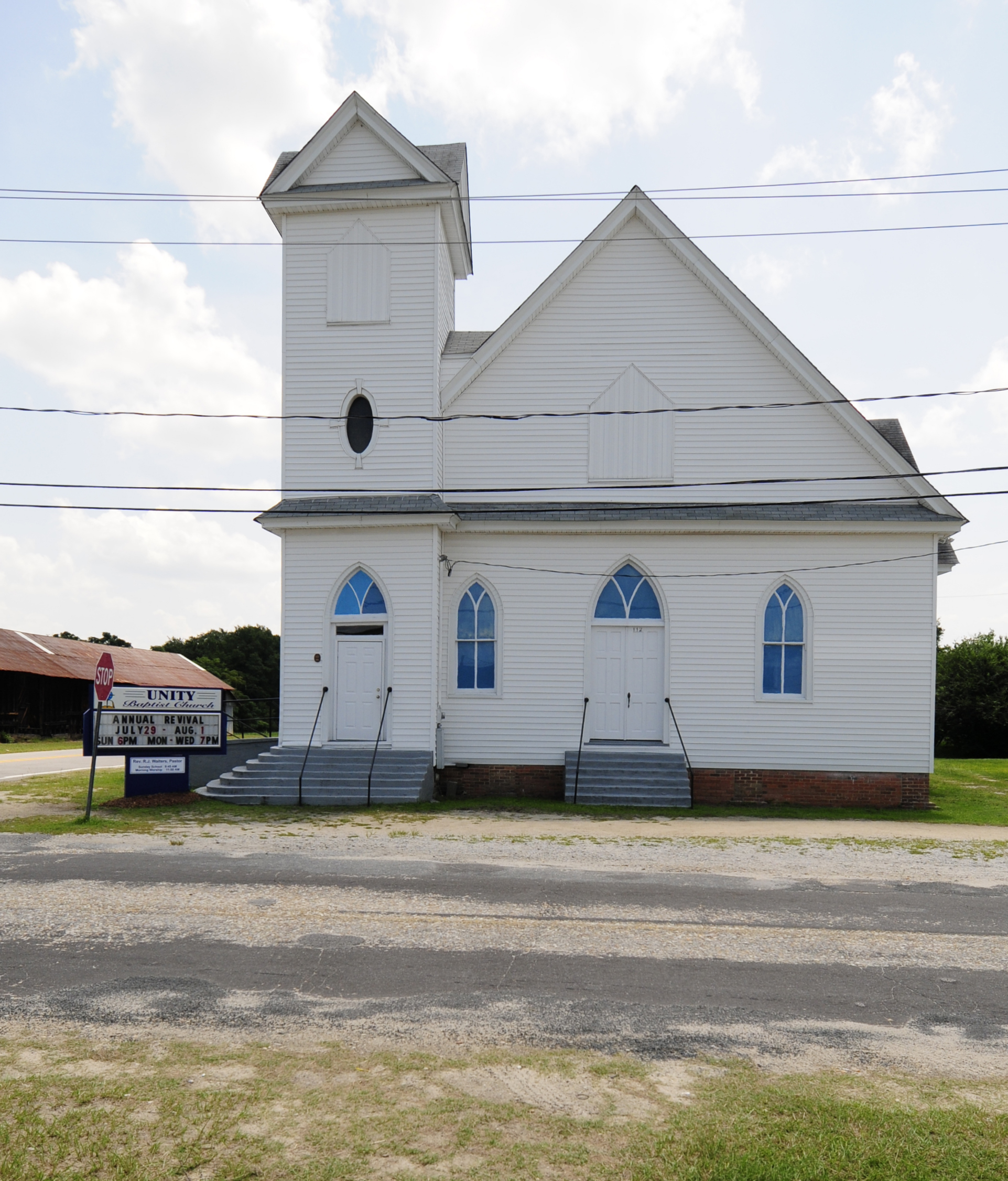

- Location within South Carolina Location within the United States
- Location: Sumter and Hart Sts., Kershaw, South Carolina
- Coordinates: 34°32′49″N 80°34′50″W
- Area: less than one acre
- Built: 1910
- Architect: Shropshire, George L.
- Architectural style: Late Gothic Revival
- MPS: Lancaster County MPS
- NRHP reference No.: 90000098
- Added to NRHP: February 16, 1990

Unity Baptist Church is a historic African American Baptist church at Sumter and Hart Streets in Kershaw, Lancaster County, South Carolina. It was built in 1910, and is a Late Gothic Revival style frame church building. Also on the property are the contributing church's parsonage and its privy.

It was added to the National Register of Historic Places in 1990.
