= Nelson Sullivan =

American videographer (1948–1989)

- Born: John Nelson Sullivan; March 15, 1948; Kershaw, South Carolina, U.S.
- Died: July 4, 1989 (aged 41); New York City, U.S.
- Burial place: Kershaw City Cemetery, Kershaw, South Carolina, U.S.
- Occupation: Videographer
- Years active: 1983–1989
- Website: YouTube channel Website

John Nelson Sullivan (March 15, 1948 – July 4, 1989) was an American videographer who chronicled life in Downtown Manhattan's arts and club scene from 1976 until his death. His hundreds of videos documented daily life in the city, nights out on the town and private moments with friends in the local entertainment community, including RuPaul, Keith Haring, Sylvia Miles, Larry Tee, Susanne Bartsch, Tom Rubnitz, Lady Bunny, Phoebe Legere, Michael Musto, Ethyl Eichelberger, John Sex, and Michael Alig.

Viewed today, Sullivan's video record of his life represents a pre-Internet form of vlogging, while his frequently used technique of turning the camera to face himself clearly anticipates the modern selfie.

In 2012, Sullivan's video archive was received as a donation by the Fales Library & Special Collections at New York University. Edited versions of select tapes may be viewed on the YouTube channel 5NinthAvenueProject.

== Early life ==
Sullivan was born in Kershaw, South Carolina, on March 15, 1948 to Mark D. Sullivan (1914-1976) and Blanche M. (Culvern; 1914-2012) and He was the younger of two sons in a family that was attached to a large cotton fortune. When he was about five years old, Sullivan's family moved next-door to the family of another young boy, James Prioleau Richards III. "Dick" Richards was to become his lifelong friend, artistic partner, and the person most responsible for preserving Sullivan's archive. Richards recalled, "We were both clocked as sissy/queer early on, which didn't make for a pleasant school experience." However, he noted that even their small town offered opportunities for cultural advancement: Sullivan's mother secured teachers to instruct him in art and the piano, and both boys were well read. Films at the town cinema and shows on television offered tantalizing possibilities of a glittering life far away. These elements, Richards said, "are the deep background for Nelson's video art — loving to go out to experience the glamour of nightclubs and theater after having envied it so long; relishing the freedom that a large city gives for self-expression that a small town scorns."

After graduating from Davidson College in Davidson, North Carolina, with a degree in English, Sullivan moved to Manhattan in 1971. While many men his age were being sent to the Vietnam War, Sullivan was classified 4-F as the result of injuries he received in a near-fatal fall into an abandoned gold mine as a youth. This allowed him the freedom to undertake post-graduate studies, including film school. Sullivan also ran his own hair salon, with a summer location on Fire Island. Later, Sullivan became a cab driver in Manhattan and then a part-time music consultant at Joseph Patelson Music House, a classical music specialty store in the shadow of Carnegie Hall. The flexibility of working part-time gave him the freedom to explore the city's late-night entertainment scene. In 1981, Sullivan rented a creaky three-story house at 5 Ninth Avenue in the Meatpacking District, which was then still many years away from its rebirth as a fashionable area.

Larry Tee, Sullivan's friend and one of his last roommates, recalled in 2021 that the "dilapidated turn-of-the-century building" was "made from pieces of old ships, and thus you could see through holes in the floor to the floor below, in certain places."

== Career ==
In 1981, Dick Richards, James Bond, and Potsy Duncan used newly available home video equipment to create a weekly television program, The American Music Show, which was cablecast on Atlanta's public access television channel. On a visit to Atlanta, Sullivan was impressed with Richards' new video camera and soon bought his own set. The equipment consisted of a shoebox-size camera held on the shoulder and a recorder deck and battery pack hung from a shoulder strap. (Later, Sullivan used lighter and more maneuverable Kyocera and Ricoh 8mm camcorders.)

In 1983, Sullivan began videotaping his excursions to booming nightclubs like the Saint, The Limelight, Danceteria and Tunnel, as well as dives like the Pyramid Club and C.B.G.B. In addition to stage shows, he captured backstage intimacies and after-party antics. He videotaped the rotating cast of characters who made their way to his home. And he taped long walks with his rescue dog Blackout through the sleepy predawn streets after nights of clubbing, and evening strolls along the Hudson River piers as the sun set.

Because many of Sullivan's friends had aspirations in show business, they invited him to videotape their performances, and he gave them copies of the tapes. He also sent video reports to Richards, who showed them as part of The American Music Show.

According to Larry Tee, Sullivan's videos document "a generation of forgotten drag queens, art stars, performance artists, cultural revolutionaries, and the local color of New York of that time. John Sex, Manic Panic's Tish and Snooky, Ethyl Eichelberger, Wendy Wild, Dianne Brill, Tabboo, Chicklet, The Boy Bär Beauties, Patricia Field and Rebecca Field, Sister Dimension, Julie Jewels, Rudolf, Dean Johnson, Details magazine's Stephen Saban, The World's Arthur Weinstein, DJ Anita Sarko, Susanne Bartsch — the cameos go on and on."

"What Nelson was doing was entirely unique," Richards said in 2013. "When you watch the tapes, you'll search in vain to find another person who's videotaping these events. With AIDS ravaging the community and changing it forever, his was basically the only personal video testimony of a scene that was rapidly disintegrating."

After having a hernia due to the weight of the VHS camcorder over the years, he switched to lighter 8 mm camcorder. Sullivan began holding the camera at arm's length and pointing it at himself, and the focus and effect of his art changed. Richards explained: "Nelson developed a style where he would come in and out of the picture himself, to talk to the viewer about what was happening around them. The perspective then became what a person would see going along with Nelson somewhere."

In 1987, Richards helped arrange for RuPaul, Larry Tee and Lahoma van Zandt to move from Atlanta to New York and become Sullivan's roommates. Richards later credited Sullivan with introducing RuPaul to Fenton Bailey and Randy Barbato, who would create the World of Wonder corporation that guided his career to superstardom.

In his 1995 autobiography Lettin' It All Hang Out, RuPaul wrote, "Nelson was our New York liaison, and he introduced us to the city. Every time I walk around New York I think of him all the time. He taught us about the West Village, about Fire Island, and he introduced us to Tennessee Williams movies. He was our gay educator and taught us about our birthright, our cultural inheritance. And he always supported me, no matter what."

In 2021, Larry Tee recalled the trio's arrival at 5 Ninth Avenue: "Nelson records our van turning the corner, and captured us as we dragged our bleary faces out of the van (we had flipped the van on the interstate on the way up)." Larry Tee remembered, "At times Nelson was like a happy hyperactive life coach, and at other times could hardly drag his broken body up the steps because of his bouts of depression…. Looking back, he seemed more than a little haunted, as if he knew he was living on borrowed time."

== Death and archival preservation ==
In the summer of 1989, with advice from Richards, Sullivan decided to create his own public access show to air in New York. He quit his job at Joseph Patelson Music House, cashed out his retirement, and set out on the next phase of his life.

On July 2, Sullivan recorded the raw video he hoped to edit into the first episode of his TV show, centering the camera on himself as he walked from his neighborhood to Sheridan Square and the Stonewall Inn, site of the 1969 Stonewall Inn bar riot. His mood was darkened by the death of his friend Christina, a transgender woman who only recently had welcomed him and his camera into her bizarre rooms at the Chelsea Hotel. "I miss her terribly now and I always will," Sullivan said into his camcorder. "I would like for my first cable show to be a memorial to my friend Christina." Late in the afternoon on July 3, Sullivan recorded a video in which he and artist Bill Moye walked Blackout along the Westside Piers. As Moye and the dog jogged out ahead, Sullivan commented, "They're running all the way out there to the end of the pier, but I don't feel like running today. It's July the third, and it's the last day that I'm going to have, not to be running."

Less than 12 hours later in the early morning hours of July 4, Sullivan was dead, the victim of an apparent heart attack. He was 41 years old. Richards said he was told that because Sullivan was still alive when he reached the hospital, an autopsy was not required, and none was performed. "One of Nelson's grandfathers died from a sudden heart attack at the same age: perhaps the cause was a genetic disorder," Richards said.

Sullivan's body was returned to Kershaw, South Carolina, where he was buried at Kershaw City Cemetery following a Presbyterian graveside service. Shortly after the funeral, in accordance with their joint artistic agreement, Richards flew to New York and retrieved Sullivan's archive, shipping the more than 600 videotapes to the Atlanta house he shared with business partner Ted Rubenstein and life partner David Goldman. For the next several years, Richards watched and cataloged the 1,100+ hours of footage, which had been carefully labelled by Sullivan.

On a 1993 trip to Chicago, Richards and Goldman met Robert Coddington, a 23-year-old historian and archivist who was intrigued upon learning of Sullivan's body of work. "As a young gay man at the time, I had this acute sense that I was arriving at a fabulous party — five minutes after the lights came on," Coddington said in 2013. "I knew that AIDS was ripping apart that gay culture that had existed before. I began to ask myself, 'What was that world and what were those people like?' Upon experiencing Nelson's tapes, I began to learn the answers to those questions."

In 2001, Richards and Coddington began to edit select tapes, producing four highlight DVDs. The YouTube channel 5NinthAvenueProject was launched in 2008. As of 2025, the channel's 735 videos had been viewed more than 30.5 million times, and more than 198,000 viewers are channel subscribers.

However, despite the presence of selections on YouTube, the full collection's ultimate survival was far from certain, as the original tapes sat boxed in Richards' and Goldman's century-old house in Atlanta's Inman Park. It was through Coddington's outreach to Fales Library that the collection secured a permanent home. In 2012, Richards, Goldman and Coddington donated the original videotapes to the Fales Library & Special Collections at New York University.

== Influence and recognition ==
On April 25, 2013, Fales Library hosted a panel discussion, "Nelson Sullivan: Vlogging in the 80s," to welcome the Nelson Sullivan Video Collection to its archive. Marvin Taylor, director of Fales Library, said Sullivan "was everywhere that was important at just the right time. But, he was more than that. When Nelson turned his video camera on himself as flaneur of downtown, he found his own artistic, queer, postmodern voice. We're honored to have Nelson's videos here at NYU."

Sullivan's work was the subject of a 1994 documentary, "Nelson Sullivan's World of Wonder," directed by Bailey and Barbato.

Footage from the Nelson Sullivan Video Collection has been used in several films, including "Susanne Bartsch: On Top" (2017), "Wig" (2019),"Moby Doc" (2021) and "Tendaberry" (2024)

Footage recorded by Sullivan was featured prominently in the 1980s episode of the six-part documentary series "PRIDE" (2021) on FX. Sullivan's videos were included in several episodes of the six-part documentary series "The Andy Warhol Diaries" (2022) on Netflix.

Episode 57 -- "Nelson's Camera" -- of the podcast "This Is Love" focused on Sullivan's life and work.

Numerous live performances videotaped by Sullivan were included in the 2025 documentary The Big Johnson, about the life and death of New York rocker and performance artist Dean Johnson.

Sullivan's videos have been exhibited in museums and galleries and screened at film festivals across the US and internationally, including at the Tate Modern, the Metropolitan Museum of Art, the Tang Museum, the Museum of Contemporary Art - Los Angeles, La Mama Galleria, Nacional Centro de Arte Reina Sofía and Fort Gansevoort (the gallery that occupies the building where Sullivan lived at 5 Ninth Avenue.)

In April 2025, Sullivan's work included in the exhibit "Icons & Visionaries: Uncovering the Arts History of Lancaster County," sponsored by the Lancaster County (SC) Council of the Arts.

In June 2025, a musical play based on Sullivan's life -- "Camera Ready" -- received its world premiere at Theater for the New City. The play, written by Gary LeGault, offers a behind-the-scenes glimpse into the world of the late videographer, his relationships and personal life. The play is set to music with original songs by LeGault, who had previously published a memoir -- "Nelson Sullivan The Portapack Prince" -- of his friendship with Sullivan.

== See also ==
- Vlog
- LGBT history in New York
