= Matson Street Historic District =

Historic district in South Carolina, United States

- U.S. National Register of Historic Places
- U.S. Historic district
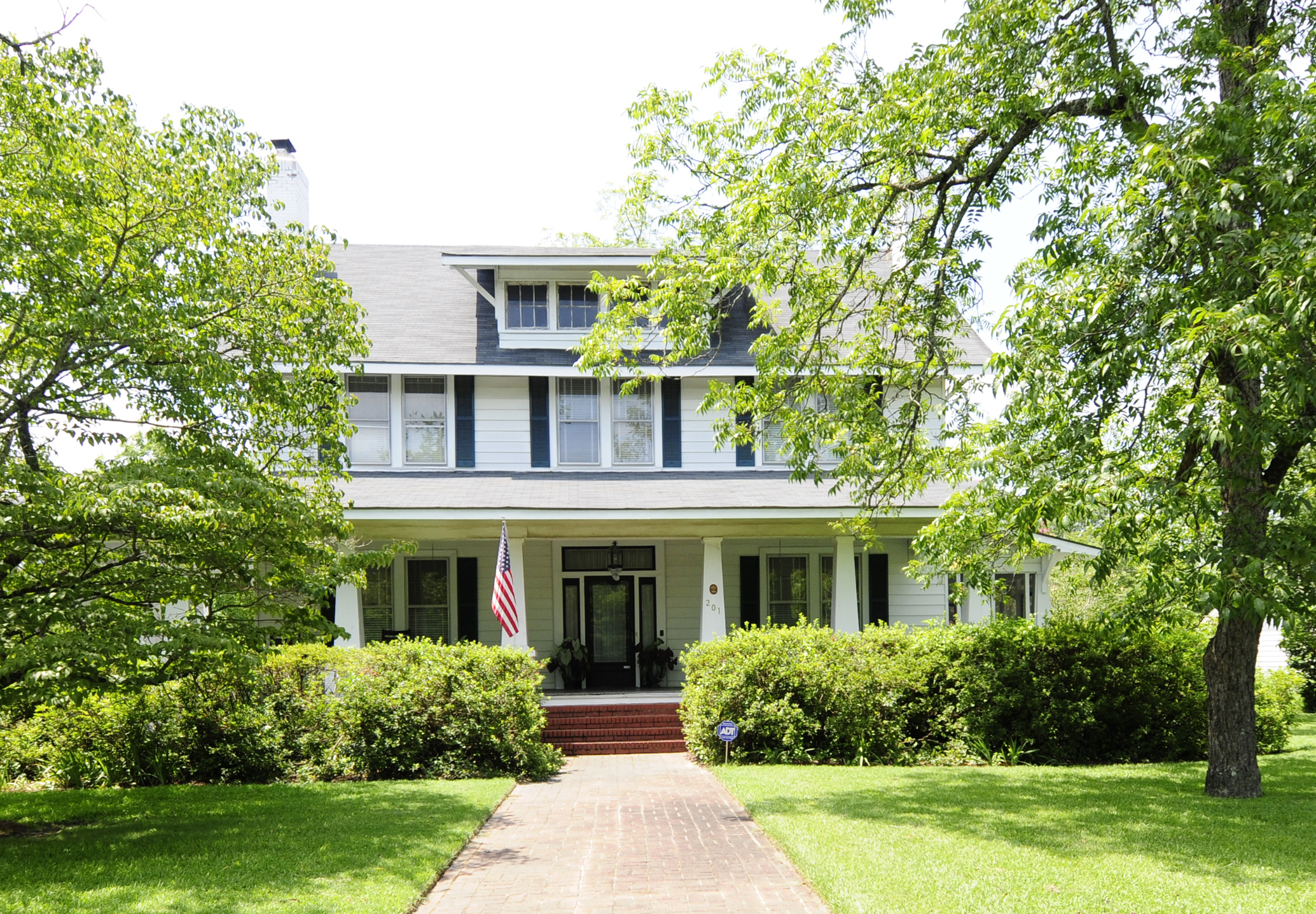
- House in the Matson Street Historic District, August 2012

- Location within South Carolina Location within the United States
- Location: Matson St. from Hilton to Pine Sts., Kershaw, South Carolina
- Coordinates: 34°32′53″N 80°35′08″W
- Area: 29.2 acres (11.8 ha)
- Architect: Johnson, J. Carroll
- Architectural style: Late 19th And 20th Century Revivals
- MPS: Lancaster County MPS
- NRHP reference No.: 89002143
- Added to NRHP: September 4, 1990

Matson Street Historic District is a national historic district located at Kershaw, Lancaster County, South Carolina. It encompasses 26 contributing buildings in a residential section of Kershaw. The majority of the buildings date from about 1890 to 1940, a particularly significant period of development in Kershaw. The houses are in a variety of representative architectural styles include Victorian, Queen Anne, Bungalow, American Craftsman, Colonial Revival, and Neo-Classical. Also located in the district is the First Presbyterian Church.

It was added to the National Register of Historic Places in 1990.
