= Starrbooty =

- Directed by: Mike Ruiz
- Written by: R.A. Charles (RuPaul)
- Produced by: R.A. Charles
- Starring: RuPaul; Candis Cayne; Lahoma Van Zandt; Gus Mattox; Jazmine Jimenez
- Music by: Songs by RuPaul
- Distributed by: Starrbooty, Inc.
- Release date: June 2, 2007
- Running time: 90 minutes
- Country: United States
- Language: English
- Budget: $500,000

Starrbooty is a 2007 spy comedy film directed by Mike Ruiz, and written by and starring RuPaul. It is a sequel to the 1987 film trilogy RuPaul Is: Starbooty! which follows its title character, a government agent and supermodel. The film co-stars Candis Cayne, Lahoma Van Zandt, Gus Mattox, and Jazmine Jimenez, with Lady Bunny, Michael Lucas, and Ari Gold in supporting roles.

== Plot ==
Starrbooty, a secret government agent and the most famous supermodel in the world, learns that her adopted niece Cornisha has been kidnapped. Intelligence collected by Starrbooty's agency handler Max and fellow agent Page Turner reveal the perpetrator is Annaka Manners, billionaire cosmetics magnate and Starrbooty's nemesis. Annaka's company is a front for the selling of organs of kidnapped prostitutes on the black market; furthermore, Annaka is actually Starrbooty's long-lost sister, making Cornisha Annaka's daughter.

To gain access to Annaka, Starrbooty goes undercover as a street walker, where she performs various sexual acts to attract the attention of Annaka's recruiter. Upon confronting Annaka, Starrbooty learns Cornisha was in on the plot all along, and has become Annaka's lover. Starrbooty responds by informing them they are mother and daughter, and that Annaka intends to double-cross Cornisha by selling her clitoris to a wealthy socialite.

A final showdown leaves Annaka dead. Cornisha's genitals are salvaged with a postmortem transplant from Annaka ("a perfect biological match") and Starrbooty and Max profess their mutual love for each other.

== Cast ==
- RuPaul as Starrbooty/Cupcake
- Lahoma Van Zandt as Page Turner/Pepper
- Candis Cayne as Annaka Manners
- Gus Mattox as Max
- Jazmine Jimenez as Cornisha
- Dee Finley as Diesel Fortensky
- Corey Corey as Junebug
- Michael Lucas as Alexi Popov
- Owen Hawk as Dirty Talker
- Richard Lynch as Ol' Smeller
- Lady Bunny as Ms. Tasha
- Laura Forbes as Mrs. McGillicutty
- Ari Gold as Tyrone Cohen
- Tim Wallis as T'Misha
- Kayla Aguirre as Kim She
- Sweetie as Ol' Lestra
- Kayvon Zand as Suicide bomber
- Andre Robert Lee as Barley
- Joe Ovbey as Kidnap caller
- Ray Stewart as Doctor
- Joelle Hawkes (Pezely) as Nurse
- Wilmer Fernandez as Manner man
- Dale Kan as Receptionist

== Production ==
Starrbooty is the fourth in a series of films starring the title character. The original three films (collectively titled RuPaul Is: Starbooty!) were all made in the mid-1980s by RuPaul and his friends with a budget of around $100, and were sold out of shopping carts around gay bars in Atlanta, Georgia.

During production the film's working title was Starrbooty: Reloaded, but when screened at film festivals it was simply called Starrbooty. The DVD title is Starrbooty: The Movie.

The film is an homage to blaxploitation and sexploitation films of the 1960s and 1970s. In an article for EdgePhiladelphia, RuPaul stated, "The goal was to make an exploitation film that was part Russ Meyer, part John Waters and part The Naked Gun." The film utilizes things like obvious vocal overdubbing, grainy footage and dramatic cuts to mimic these low-budget films of the past.

== Screenings and reception ==
The film began screening at various gay and lesbian film festivals in July 2007. RuPaul presented the film in person at each screening, often with other cast members. Erik Schut of The Philly Film Guide said "Starrbooty is a fried, dyed and laid to the side-splitting kick-ass good time!" It was the only film at the Philadelphia Gay & Lesbian Film Festival to be sold out at both screenings.

The movie's supporting cast is primarily made up of pornographic film stars, both male and female. It is unrated, and though there is no explicit sex, it does feature several of its male stars frontally nude and erect, and at one point RuPaul is depicted graphically fondling a man's penis. Though this is primarily played for comic effect, it is a marked departure from the "Drag Queen Next Door" image RuPaul cultivated during the height of her fame.

The film ends with an on-screen dedication to Jerry Falwell.

The DVD was released October 30, 2007. There was no distribution deal reached, and thus it was released by RuPaul under the imprint "Starbooty, Inc."

== Soundtrack ==
Starrbooty: Original Motion Picture Soundtrack was released June 20, 2017.

1. Call Me Starrbooty
2. The Call (Interlude)
3. A Fistful of Booty
4. Damn You Annaka! (Interlude)
5. Big Booty Opening
6. Alexi Popov (Interlude)
7. How 2 Rock It
8. Can't Fake It with the Johns (Interlude)
9. Do the Right Thing
10. Cupcake & Pepper (Interlude)
11. Sweet Pussycat of Mine
12. Ol’ Smeller (Interlude)
13. Pussycat 4 Sale
14. CBT Session (Interlude)
15. Put Some Weight On It
16. Miss Tasha (Interlude)
17. Drop That Pimp
18. Diesel Pancake Makeup (Interlude)
19. Call Me Starrbooty (Gomi's Cellular Edit)
20. Cupcake Meets Annaka (Interlude)
21. Booty Love
22. Dismembership (Interlude)
23. Call Me Starrbooty (View to a Booty)
24. Epilogue (Interlude)
25. Hey Booty
