= Kershaw, South Carolina =

- Town
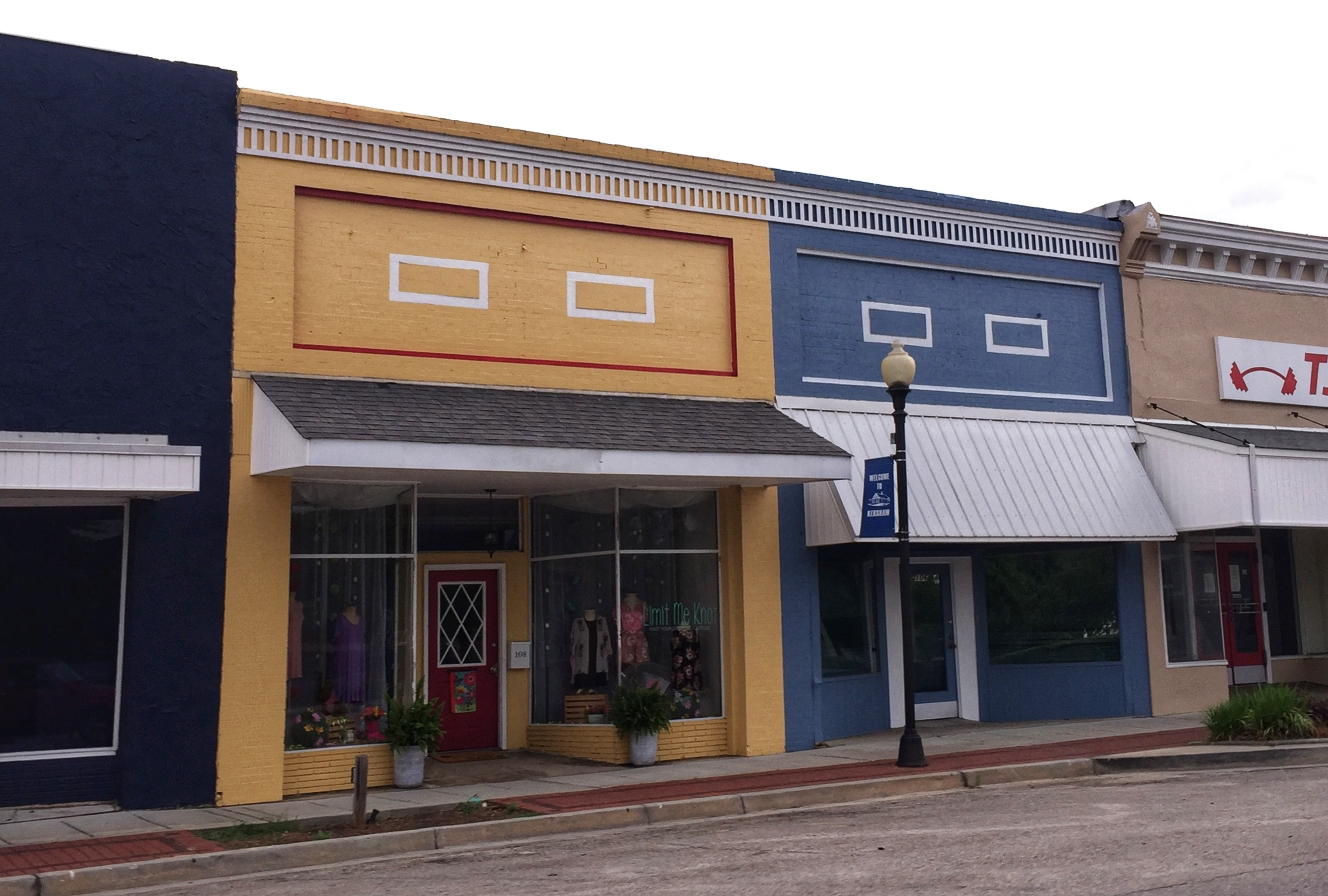
- Storefronts in Kershaw

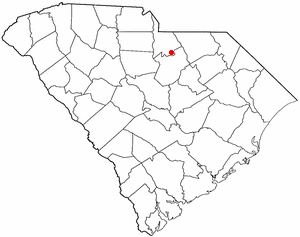
- Location of Kershaw, South Carolina
- Coordinates: 34°33′6″N 80°35′1″W
- Country: United States
- State: South Carolina
- County: Lancaster

Area
  - Total: 1.86 sq mi (4.81 km^{2})
  - Land: 1.86 sq mi (4.81 km^{2})
  - Water: 0 sq mi (0.00 km^{2})
- Elevation: 512 ft (156 m)

Population (2020)
  - Total: 1,693
  - Density: 911.5/sq mi (351.94/km^{2})
- Time zone: UTC-5 (Eastern (EST))
  - Summer (DST): UTC-4 (EDT)
- ZIP code: 29067
- Area codes: 803, 839
- FIPS code: 45-38095
- GNIS feature ID: 2405942
- Website: www.townofkershawsc.gov

Kershaw is a town in Lancaster County, South Carolina, United States. It was incorporated in 1888. As of the 2020 census, Kershaw had a population of 1,693. The Haile Gold Mine, where gold was discovered in 1825, is 3 miles (5 km) from town and was at one time the largest single producer of gold in the Appalachian region.

== History ==
The Dr. William Columbus Cauthen House, Clinton AME Zion Church, East Richland Street-East Church Street Historic District, Kershaw Depot, Matson Street Historic District, and Unity Baptist Church, are listed on the National Register of Historic Places. Uriah Plantation is also located in the town.

== Geography and climate ==
Kershaw is located in southern Lancaster County, immediately north and west of Kershaw County. U.S. Routes 521 and 601 pass through the town. US 521 leads northwest 6 miles (10 km) to Heath Springs and 17 miles (27 km) to Lancaster, the county seat, while US 601 leads northeast 22 miles (35 km) to Pageland. Together the two highways lead south 21 miles (34 km) to Camden. Kershaw is 54 miles (87 km) northeast of Columbia, the state capital, and 60 miles (97 km) south of Charlotte, North Carolina.

According to the United States Census Bureau, the town has a total area of 2.1 square miles (5.4 km^{2}), all land. The town drains west to Lick Creek and east to the Little Lynches River, all part of the Lynches River watershed flowing southeast to the Great Pee Dee River.

== Demographics ==
Historical population
Census	Pop.	Note	%±
1900	1,002		—
1910	950		−5.2%
1920	1,022		7.6%
1930	1,120		9.6%
1940	1,264		12.9%
1950	1,376		8.9%
1960	1,567		13.9%
1970	990		−36.8%
1980	1,993		101.3%
1990	1,814		−9.0%
2000	1,645		−9.3%
2010	1,803		9.6%
2020	1,693		−6.1%
U.S. Decennial Census

=== 2020 census ===
Kershaw racial composition
Race	Num.	Perc.
White (non-Hispanic)	1,100	64.97%
Black or African American (non-Hispanic)	478	28.23%
Native American	9	0.53%
Asian	6	0.35%
Other/Mixed	70	4.13%
Hispanic or Latino	30	1.77%

As of the 2020 United States census, there were 1,693 people, 736 households, and 480 families residing in the town.

=== 2000 census ===
At the 2000 census there were 1,645 people, and 465 families in the town. The population density was 888.5 inhabitants per square mile (343.1/km^{2}). There were 771 housing units at an average density of 416.4 per square mile (160.8/km^{2}). The racial makeup of the town was 75.68% White, 22.80% African American, 0.36% Native American, 0.12% Asian, 0.24% from other races, and 0.79% from two or more races. Hispanic or Latino of any race were 0.73%.

Of the 690 households 26.8% had children under the age of 18 living with them, 50.7% were married couples living together, 13.0% had a female householder with no husband present, and 32.6% were non-families. 30.1% of households were one person and 16.8% were one person aged 65 or older. The average household size was 2.38 and the average family size was 2.95.

The age distribution was 22.5% under the age of 18, 8.6% from 18 to 24, 24.5% from 25 to 44, 23.0% from 45 to 64, and 21.3% 65 or older. The median age was 42 years. For every 100 females, there were 86.7 males. For every 100 females age 18 and over, there were 82.1 males.

The median household income was $36,065 and the median family income was $41,204. Males had a median income of $30,987 versus $21,827 for females. The per capita income for the town was $16,370. About 9.5% of families and 14.4% of the population were below the poverty line, including 19.6% of those under age 18 and 11.4% of those age 65 or over.

== Education ==
Kershaw has a public library, a branch of the Lancaster County Library. High School students are served by Andrew Jackson High School

== Notable people ==
- Randy Hinson (1912–2006) - United States Army colonel; college football and baseball coach.
- Dick Richards (1946–2018) - American video artist, music producer and TV personality.
- Nelson Sullivan (1948–1989) - American videographer who is often credited as the first vlogger.
- Elizabeth Threatt (1926–1993) - American actress of native-American descent.
