= RuPaul (talk show) =

American television talk show

- Genre: Talk show
- Presented by: RuPaul
- Country of origin: United States
- Original language: English
- No. of seasons: 1
- No. of episodes: 15

Production
- Executive producer: Jill van Lokeren
- Camera setup: Multi-camera
- Production companies: World of Wonder; Telepictures

Original release
- Network: Syndicated
- Release: June 10 – June 28, 2019

RuPaul is an American daytime talk show hosted by drag queen and television host RuPaul. It premiered on June 10, 2019, with a three-week test run on selected Fox TV stations. It was produced by Telepictures and Warner Bros., with Jill van Lokeren as executive producer. A teaser was released on April 2, 2019. After being broadcast on seven Fox stations, the show was not commissioned for a full series, since similar projects outperformed it – resulting in its cancellation.

== Background ==
RuPaul was developed by Telepictures with hopes for a syndicated fall 2019 launch. While most networks picked up shows produced by studios that are also owned by their parent company, RuPaul, being produced by a subsidiary of the independent Warner Bros., had a "tougher" time finding a network to express interest. According to Deadline, Fox has been "open to programs from outside studios" and "ramping up its limited-run pickups" after being downsized following its acquisition by Disney, and this factored into the network picking up the show.

== Overview ==
The series was referred to as a "modern take on the talk show format", with RuPaul saying that he wanted to "spread love" with the show.

The premiere episode featured late-night talk show host James Corden, and stars of the Property Brothers, identical twin brothers Drew Scott and Jonathan Scott. Following episodes featured Ciara, Iggy Azalea, Adam Lambert, Leah Remini, Cory Booker, Matt Bomer, Kristin Chenoweth, Lisa Vanderpump, Ricki Lake, Blac Chyna, Darnell Jordan, James Fox, Edward Hibbert and Paula Abdul as guests. Regular co-hosts on the show were RuPaul's Drag Race judges Michelle Visage and Ross Mathews.

== Episodes ==
=== Season 1 (2019) ===
No.	Title	Original release date	Prod. code
1	"James Corden/Jonathan and Drew Scott"	June 10, 2019	1RUA01
2	"Paula Abdul/Adam Rippon/Kaliegh Garris/Cheslie Kryst/Nia Franklin"	June 11, 2019	1RUA02
3	"Cory Booker/Jack Osbourne"	June 12, 2019	1RUA03
4	"Jana Kramer/Mike Caussin/Tarek El Moussa"	June 13, 2019	1RUA04
5	"Loni Love/Matt Iseman"	June 14, 2019	1RUA05
6	"Lisa Vanderpump/Gus Kenworthy"	June 17, 2019	1RUA06
7	"Billy Eichner/Hannah Brown"	June 18, 2019	1RUA07
8	"Monica/Gayle King/Ryan O'Connell"	June 19, 2019	1RUA08
9	"Kristin Chenoweth/Chrissy Metz/BYU student Matt Easton"	June 20, 2019	1RUA09
10	"Ciara/Melissa Radke Matt Easton"	June 21, 2019	1RUA10
11	"Adam Lambert"	June 24, 2019	1RUA11
12	"Iggy Azalea/Tyler Henry"	June 25, 2019	1RUA12
13	"Leah Remini/Cheyenne Jackson"	June 26, 2019	1RUA13
14	"Blac Chyna/Ricki Lake"	June 27, 2019	1RUA14
15	"Matt Bomer/Marcia Gay Harden"	June 28, 2019	1RUA15
