= Kershaw station =

- Kershaw Depot
- U.S. National Register of Historic Places
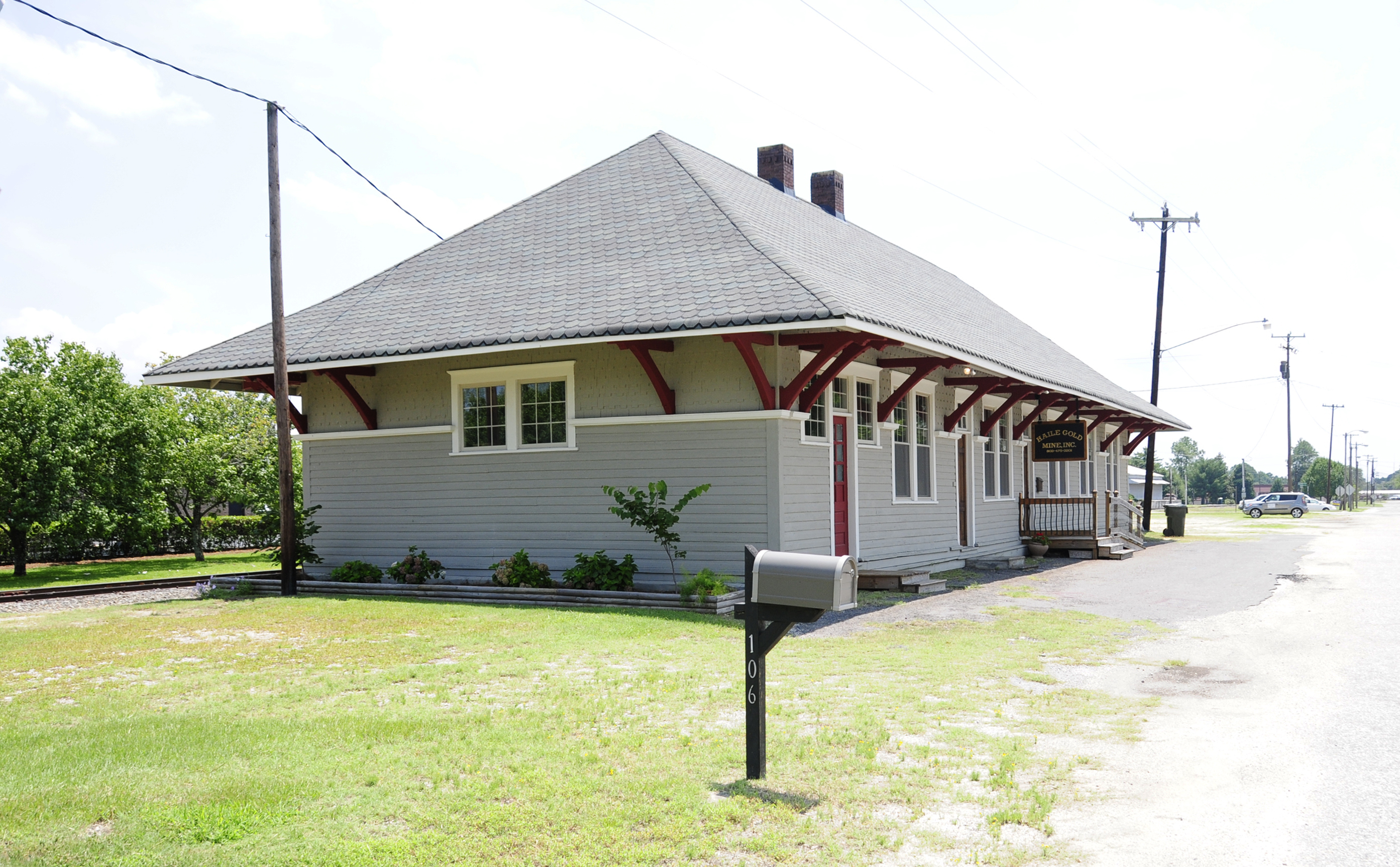
- Kershaw Depot, August 2012

- Location within South Carolina Location within the United States
- Location: Cleveland St., Kershaw, South Carolina
- Coordinates: 34°32′49″N 80°34′58″W
- Area: less than one acre
- Built: 1926
- Architect: Southern Railway
- Architectural style: Late 19th And Early 20th Century American Movements
- MPS: Lancaster County MPS
- NRHP reference No.: 90000096
- Added to NRHP: February 16, 1990

Kershaw Depot, also known as the Southern Railway Depot, is a historic train station located at Kershaw, Lancaster County, South Carolina. It was built in 1926, by the Southern Railway, and is the second or third depot built in Kershaw. The interior plan consists of a central ticketing area flanked by white and "colored" waiting areas. The Southern Railway sold the depot in 1945, and it has since been used as a florist and craft shop.

It was added to the National Register of Historic Places in 1990.
