= East Richland Street-East Church Street Historic District =

Historic district in South Carolina, United States

- U.S. National Register of Historic Places
- U.S. Historic district
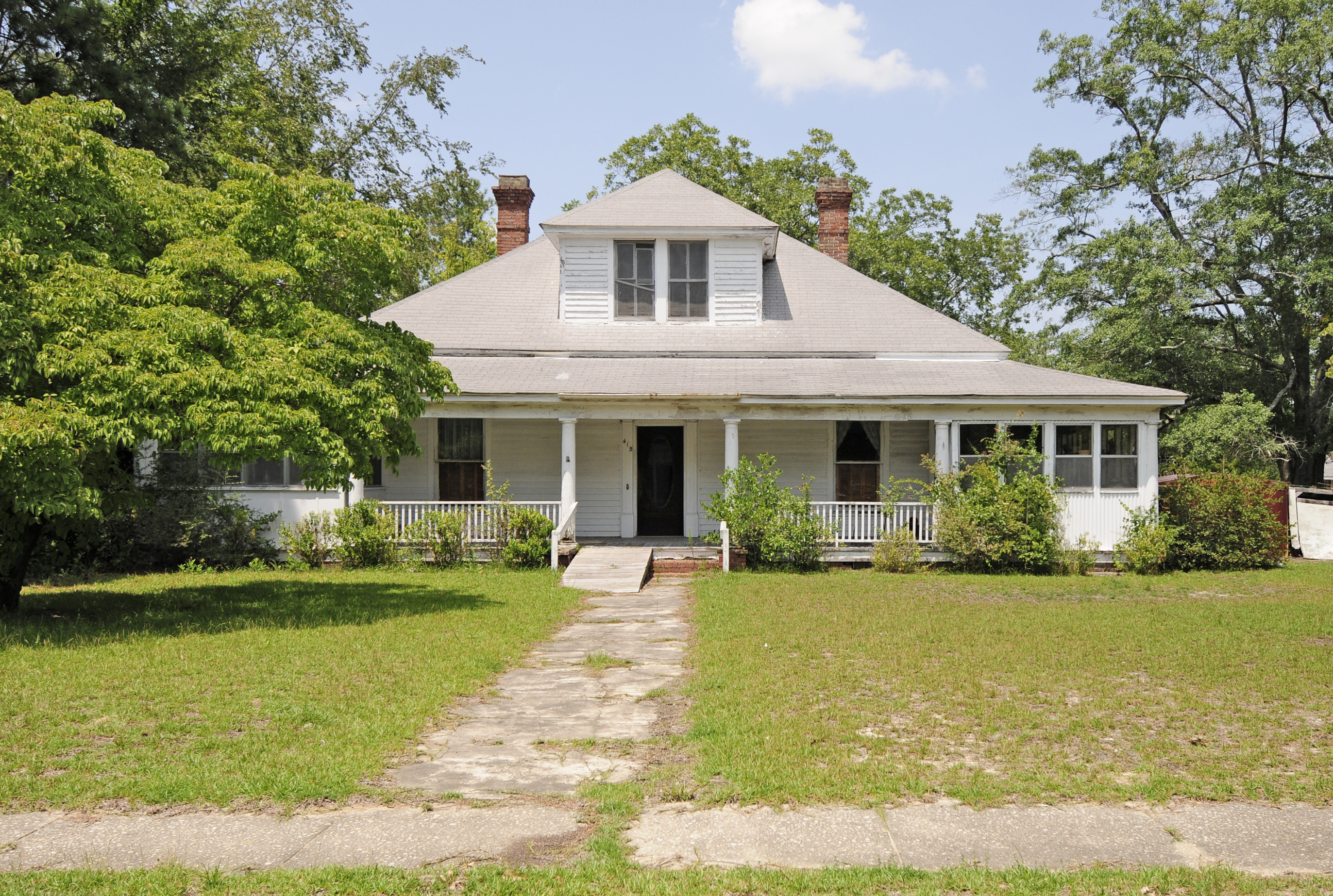
- House on East Richland Street, August 2012

- Location within South Carolina Location within the United States
- Location: Roughly bounded by E. Church St., Ingram St., E. Richland St., and Hart St., Kershaw, South Carolina
- Coordinates: 34°33′03″N 80°34′47″W
- Area: 31.4 acres (12.7 ha)
- Architectural style: Late 19th And Early 20th Century American Movements, Late 19th And 20th Century Revivals, Late Victorian
- MPS: Lancaster County MPS
- NRHP reference No.: 89002142
- Added to NRHP: January 4, 1990

East Richland Street-East Church Street Historic District is a national historic district located at Kershaw, Lancaster County, South Carolina. It encompasses 28 contributing buildings in a residential section of Kershaw. The majority of the residences date from about 1890 to 1920, a particularly significant period of development in Kershaw. The houses are in a variety of representative architectural styles include Victorian, Queen Anne, Colonial Revival, and Neo-Classical.

It was added to the National Register of Historic Places in 1990.
