= White Lotus Day =

Celebration of Theosophists

White Lotus Day is a celebration of Theosophists. It is celebrated 8 May, the anniversary of the death of Helena Petrovna Blavatsky, founder of the Theosophical Society. Though there are several theosophical organisations, this is one celebration they have in common.

White Lotus Day is a celebration that encourages meditation about the metaphor of the lotus. The lotus is born under the mud, growing through the water to achieve the surface, and therefore the air and the light of sun. This growth is identified with man's life, born in earth but desiring the elevation to the air; representing his middle stage between animals and the ultimate reality. The seeds of lotus contain (even before they germinate) perfectly formed leaves, a miniature shape of what they would become. This flower is often present in eastern religions, which were key influences in the Theosophical Movement.

Lotus (Gr.). A most occult plant, sacred in Egypt, India and elsewhere; called “the child of the Universe bearing the likeness of its mother in its bosom”. There was a time “when the world was a golden lotus” (padma) says the allegory. A great variety of these plants, from the majestic Indian lotus, down to the marsh-lotus (bird’s foot trefoil) and the Grecian “Dioscoridis”, is eaten at Crete and other islands. It is a species of nymphala, first introduced from India to Egypt to which it was-not indigenous. See the text of Archaic Symbolism in the Appendix Viii. “The Lotus, as a Universal Symbol”.

== Explanation ==
White Lotus Day

In her will, HPB suggested that her friends might gather together on the anniversary of her death (May 8, 1891) and read from Sir Edwin Arnold's The Light of Asia and from The Bhagavad Gita. Lotuses grew in unusual profusion one year later. Hence, May 8 became known as White Lotus Day.
