= The American Music Show =

American queer television program (1981-2005)

- Created by: Dick Richards
- Country of origin: United States
- Original language: English

Original release
- Network: People TV
- Release: 1981 – 2005

The American Music Show is a weekly public access variety television program, produced from 1981 to 2005 in Atlanta, Georgia by Dick Richards, James Bond, Potsy Duncan, and Bud "Beebo" Lowry. It aired on People TV and featured drag and musical performances, parodic sketch comedy, interviews, and reports from around Atlanta. The show became very influential in Atlanta's LGBT subculture, and due to its longevity, it has been described as "one of the most thorough archives of LGBT Atlanta history." RuPaul also made frequent appearances on the show.

== Production and locations ==
Episodes were generally filmed in producer Dick Richards's Inman Park house on a budget of five dollars (the cost of a VHS tape). The show also included remote segments from around the city, which were filmed on-site and incidentally captured much of Atlanta's history on tape, from old cruising trails in Piedmont Park to the construction of Freedom Parkway.

== Content and style ==
The American Music Show has a low-budget and campy aesthetic that has been characterized as a "John Waters-esque absurdism." Many musicians and drag performers were featured on the show over its 24-year run—most notably RuPaul, who debuted in 1982. He writes about his experience on show in his autobiography Lettin' It All Hang Out, where it is described as "basically a variety show consisting of skits with a sick sense of humor performed by a kooky cast." Other notable acts included Jayne County, Lady Bunny, The Fabulous Pop Tarts, The Now Explosion, The Singing Peek Sisters, Lahoma van Zandt, and DJ Larry Tee, among many others. After the show, Larry Tee went on to popularize the "electroclash" music genre and helped to launch the careers of bands like Scissor Sisters, while Randy Barbato and Fenton Bailey of The Fabulous Pop Tarts went on to produce (with RuPaul) the Emmy-winning reality television show RuPaul's Drag Race.

Short films like Starbooty's Revenge and Comes the Blood were also occasionally played on the show, in addition to recurring comedic segments such as "Who's Home Drunk?" and episodes dedicated to music like the "Space Seed Video Freak Out Party." The program did not avoid political engagement, either; for instance, in a clip from a 1987 episode, RuPaul and Wanda Peek confront the Ku Klux Klan face-to-face at a rally in Cumming, Georgia.

The original VHS recordings of The American Music Show are currently housed in the Stuart A. Rose Manuscript, Archives, and Rare Book Library at Emory University.

== Funtone USA ==
Alongside The American Music Show, Dick Richards also co-founded, with Ted Rubenstein, a media company called Funtone USA. Funtone released music by some of the performers who appeared on the show, including RuPaul's first three records—Sex Freak (1985), RuPaul is Star Booty (1986), and the single "Ping Ting Ting" —as well as music by Larry Tee, La Palace de Beauté, DeAundra Peek, and The Fabulous Pop Tarts. The motto of Funtone USA also well describe the outlook of The American Music Show: "If it's not fun, don't do it!"
