= RuPaul Is: Starbooty! =

1987 American underground film trilogy

- Directed by: Jon Witherspoon
- Written by: Jon Witherspoon
- Produced by: Jon Witherspoon
- Starring: RuPaul; Larry Tee; Lady Bunny
- Music by: RuPaul
- Distributed by: Funtone Records
- Release date: 1987
- Running time: 60 minutes
- Country: United States
- Language: English

RuPaul is: Starbooty! is a 1987 underground film trilogy starring a young RuPaul, then a largely unknown drag queen. The low-budget films were inconsistently presented with title variations including "Star Booty" and "Starrbooty" across posters, advertisements, and indy video releases.

== Plot ==
Filmed on a zero-dollar budget, the movies are a pastiche of 1960s blaxploitation films. RuPaul stars as Starbooty, a crime fighting federal agent who disposes of villains while getting entangled in romantic liaisons. At the time, RuPaul was still participating in a type of drag known as genderfuck; as such his appearance generally is of a man with feminine makeup and clothes, but no padding or taping to make the body look female.

Outside the canon of the actual films, a sketch on RuPaul's VH1 talk show continued the storyline of the character of Starbooty with a preview for an alleged new film called "Starbooty in: Take That You Honky Bitch".

== Sequel and distribution ==
In 2006 RuPaul used his blog to discuss a film he was in the process of making which he called The Untitled RuPaul Movie. The film was initially titled Starrbooty: Reloaded but was ultimately called Starrbooty. The film follows similar plot lines from the previous ones, but contains more sexually explicit content.

When originally produced, cheaply manufactured video cassettes were passed out on the streets and at clubs. They were also sold, on DVD, at the website of Funtone Records, a trademark established by John Witherspoon, the man who paid to produce the films originally, until Witherspoon's death.

The films are currently out of print and not in active distribution.

== Feature films ==
Star Booty I: The Motion Picture opens with the kidnapping of President Ronald Reagan’s son, Ron Reagan, in an affluent Atlanta neighborhood by the Evil Twins, one male and the other female. The word is spread quickly. Max, a secret agent, calls Star Booty, an ex-model turned secret agent to alert her of the situation. Star Booty is then revealed in the conversation to be a patriotic American citizen. She is grateful that her employment with the United States government has turned her life into something positive, something she keeps repeating in the film. Hiding in a house, the Evil Twins reveal that they plan to infect the world with the AIDS virus, which they have samples of bottled in a jar. When the Twins discover Star Booty snooping around, they decide to dump the virus through the water pipes. Star Booty breaks in and thwarts the plan. The Twins start to fight her and as they fight, Star Booty finds heroin on the male twin. As both twins are lying unconscious Star Booty gives a heartfelt monologue about her mission to purge drugs from society. The Twins wake up and try to escape, but Star Booty's quick reflexes stop them. Star Booty throws the Twins from the second story to the ground and they die. Later, Max calls Star Booty to congratulate her on her success. While he is speaking, Max and his secretary are fondling and doing heroin, which may suggest a conspiracy.

Star Booty II: The Mack is the sequel. RuPaul reprises her role as Star Booty. The film opens with Cornisha, leaving her pimp Mack's hideout and renouncing her harlot ways. Mack is furious and beats her down. Cornisha, injured, manages to escape and reach a payphone to call Star Booty. As she is talking, Cornisha dies, as a result of her injuries. A helicopter arrives with Max. Max is shown from the back and played by a different actor and his face is never revealed. He meets Star Booty in downtown and gives her information about Mack. Star Booty vows to avenge her sister's death and to kill Mack.

On the streets of Atlanta, a whore named Lizeth, and two unnamed ones, hustle for their breakfast. Star Booty, undercover, comes upon these girls with a swagger and a confidence that they don't have. She inquires whether they have a pimp or not and she urges them to be self-reliant and join her. Lizeth is revealed to be pessimistic and emotionally codependent on Mack and claims he treats her right and is reluctant to do so. Eventually, she befriends them and before long, they are running the streets together.

Mack sees Star Booty on a street corner and takes her to his bar hideout. Mack is smitten by Star Booty and gives her a puff of his cigarette. Their canoodling is interrupted by a phone call. The caller who is revealed to be Lizeth, warns Mack that Star Booty is going to kill him. While Mack is speaking on the phone, Star Booty starts snooping around for evidence and discovers files that show evidence of her sister's murder, alcohol, and exploiting of women. Mack catches Star Booty and she reveals who she really is and why she is there. Star Booty escapes and meets with the other girls and discovers that Lizeth is the traitor and Star Booty and the other girls go find her. Unbeknownst to them, Lizeth is searching for Star Booty to kill her. Star Booty and the girls encounter Lizeth who pulls a knife on them. A fight ensues and Lizeth is killed. Star Booty searches for Mack and finds him in a parking lot. A scuffle ensues and during the fight, Mack pulls a Tommy gun that Star Booty manages to knock out of his hand before he can shoot. Quick thinking and fast reflexes, she picks up the gun and kills Mack. Star Booty meets with Max, gives him searches for Mack and finds him in a parking lot. The films closes with a song called “The Mack”.

Star Booty III: Star Booty's Revenge is the third installment. The film opens with Max, telling Star Booty of her new assignment. The Singing Peek Sisters have kidnapped Larry Tee. This time the film takes us from Atlanta to New York city. There's an opening montage of shots that show Star Booty undercover throughout the city. Star Booty arrives at the hideout of the Singing Peek Sisters where they have tied Larry Tee with dynamite and apparently are angry with not having a recording contract while their rivals do. Star Booty encourages them to trust her and to follow her plan to success. They let Tee go and with Star Booty's help, they hit the recording studio and start promoting themselves in New York city and eventually make it to number one on the Billboard charts. In the end, Star Booty says, "I knew they could do it".

== Soundtrack ==
RuPaul Is Star Booty

Soundtrack album by RuPaul
- Released: 1986
- Genre: Pop rock; electronic
- Length: 33:10
- Label: Funtone; Every
- Producer: The Pop Tarts (Fenton Tart; Randy Pop)

RuPaul chronology
Sex Freak (1985)	RuPaul Is Star Booty (1986)	Supermodel of the World (1993)

RuPaul Is Star Booty was released in 1986 on LP along with the movie RuPaul Is: Starbooty!, as an Original Motion Picture Soundtrack with 8 songs. It was released by Atlanta-based label, Funtone Records. On October 7, 1997 the soundtrack was released to CD in conjunction with Every Records. It marks the first collaboration between RuPaul and producers Fenton Bailey and Randy Barbato (The Fabulous Pop Tarts), who went on to found World of Wonder, the production company that now produces RuPaul's Drag Race.

=== Track listing ===
Writing credits adapted from AllMusic.

No.	Title	Writer(s)	Length
1.	"The Mack"		4:46
2.	"Make That Move"		5:42
3.	"Ghetto Love"		4:15
4.	"Star Booty"	Bryan Chambers; John Witherspoon	4:41
5.	"You Want Love (Follow Me)"	Randy Pop; Fenton Tart	2:56
6.	"Everything"	Randy Pop; RuPaul Charles; Fenton Tart	3:54
7.	"You Are the World (To Me)"	Randy Pop; Fenton Tart	4:20
8.	"Ernestine's Rap"	Nancy Nolan; Robert Warren	2:36
Total length:			33:10

=== Release history ===
Format	Date	Label(s)
LP	1986	Funtone
CD	October 7, 1997	Every/Funtone

== See also ==
- The American Music Show
