= Wilfried Knight =

French gay pornographic film actor

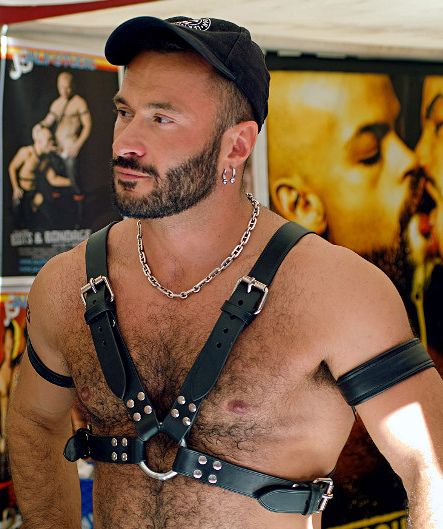
- Wilfried Knight at Folsom Street Fair
- Born: Wilfried Jean-Pierre Chevalier; 19 February 1975; Châlons-sur-Marne, France
- Died: 5 March 2013 (aged 38); Vancouver, Canada

Wilfried Knight (19 February 1975 – 5 March 2013) was a French gay pornographic film actor and model. Born in Châlons-sur-Marne, France, he later worked primarily in the United States and appeared in productions for several major studios in the gay adult film industry.

== Career ==
Knight began working in the gay adult film industry after being discovered by director and producer Michael Lucas. He adopted the stage name Wilfried Knight and appeared in a number of productions for Lucas Entertainment, gaining attention for his muscular physique, his body hair and European background. He later expanded his work to other studios, including Raging Stallion, Titan Media, and Colt Studio Group.

Before entering adult films, Knight had studied law and worked as a fitness trainer. He also lived in London before relocating to North America, where his career developed further. During his time in the industry, he became known for versatile roles and appearances in large-scale productions, which contributed to award nominations and wins in the early 2010s.

== Death ==
Knight committed suicide on 5 March 2013 in Vancouver, Canada. His death occurred two weeks after the suicide of his American husband, Jerry Enriquez. The couple had faced prolonged immigration difficulties, as their Canadian marriage was not recognized under U.S. federal law at the time, preventing Knight from obtaining residency through his spouse. After Enriquez lost his job in Canada, the couple's ability to remain together became uncertain. Following his partner's death, Knight wrote publicly about the legal and personal challenges they had faced before taking his own life.

== Awards and nominations ==
=== Grabby Awards ===
- 2010 – Winner: Best Versatile Performer
- 2010 – Nominated: Performer of the Year
- 2011 – Winner: Best Versatile Performer
- 2011 – Nominated: Performer of the Year

=== HustlaBall Awards ===
- 2010 – Winner: Best American Performer

=== XBIZ Awards ===
- 2012 – Nominated: Gay Performer of the Year

== See also ==
- List of performers in gay porn films
