= Lettin' It All Hang Out =

Book by RuPaul

- First edition
- Author: RuPaul
- Language: English
- Publisher: Hyperion
- Publication date: 1995
- Media type: Hardcover
- Pages: 240
- ISBN: 978-0-7868-6156-9
- OCLC: 31657240
- Dewey Decimal: 306.77 B 20
- LC Class: HQ77 .R87 1995

Lettin' It All Hang Out is the autobiography of drag performer RuPaul. The book was originally released in 1995 in hardback, and then in paperback a year later. Although the book is classed as an autobiography, it is self described as "part auto-biography, part how-to manual". Aside from RuPaul's life story, the book also contains a chapter on beauty tips, as well as many black and white photographs of him both in and out of drag, and lists of his favorite things, songs, quotes or people, e.g. "RuPaul's Favorite Drag Queen Movies" and "RuPaul's Favorite Actresses".

== Chapters ==
As well as a foreword and an afterword, the book is made up of 21 chapters, titled "How to Tuck", "Little Ruru", "Mean Miss Charles", "School Daze", "Three Sisters", "Hotlanta", "If It Ain't Fun, Don't Do It", "Wee Wee Pole", "New York Is a Big, Fat, Greasy Ho", "Starrbooty", "Down and Out in New York; London and L.A.", "Queen of Manhattan", "Work the Runway, Sweetie", "You Better Work", "Transy-Europe Express", "Hollywood Ho", "Mr. and Miss Television", "The Pinball Wizard", "Public Domain", "A Goddess Struggling to Be Born" and "Big Daddy".

== Synopsis ==
The foreword describes RuPaul's motivations for writing the book and mentions some of the misconceptions he wishes to challenge about himself and drag. In the first chapter he then discusses his routine of getting into drag, and his tips and tricks for how others can do the same. After this he begins the autobiographic section of the book, starting with his birth and his parents, and going on to describe how witnessing their abusive relationship with each other and their eventual divorce affected him and his sisters. However, he also describes happy childhood memories with his mother and sisters along with his admiration for them and the inspiration he gained from them. Additionally, he discusses the feeling of otherness he experienced because of his sexuality, his struggle with his gender and femininity, his first inspiration from TV and magazines, and his early experimentation with hair and makeup.

From chapter 6 he recounts his experience moving with his sister Renetta and her husband Laurence to Atlanta, after living with them for 6 months in El Cajon. Here he describes his final full year of school; 10th grade at Northside School of Performing Arts, seeing his first drag performance, and working as a car salesman for 5 years. After this he discusses his years in Atlanta performing on public access shows such as The American Music Show, his first time in drag, renting his first apartment, attending a march against the Ku Klux Klan, his experience with drugs, his bands U-Haul and Wee Wee Pole, recording his first album Sex Freak, starring in the Trilogy of Terror series, writing and selling books and his experience being homeless.

From chapter 9 he describes his time working as a go-go dancer at the Pyramid in New York and then Weekends in Atlanta, as well as his experience starring in comedy films Starrbooty, Mahogany II, American Porn Star, Psycho Bitch and Voyeur. He then discusses the struggles of moving back to New York to continue working as a go-go dancer, working for Michael Alig, unemployment, homelessness and suicidal thoughts.

From chapter 12 RuPaul talks about moving back to New York and improving his skills in performing in drag, alongside adopting a more glamorous drag look. He gives a detailed description of the contents of his typical drag act, and describes the social climate in New York that he believes helped people connect with his performances. He also includes advice on how to lip sync and a list of his favorite songs to lip sync to in this section. He then describes his struggles with both alcoholism and sobriety. After this, he discusses his time recording his album Supermodel of the World and the inspiration behind it, as well as the process of filming the music video for "Supermodel (You Better Work)" and a description of his typical performance of it during the Supermodel world tour.

RuPaul goes on to describe his rise to fame in both the US and Europe, and his experience working with different interviewers and celebrities such as Milton Berle, Courtney Love, Kurt Cobain, Queen Latifah and Elton John. He also discusses how he chooses to identify himself and his experience with fame and the press. The book comes to an end with his thoughts on masculine culture and "goddess energy", a chapter on his relationship with his father and how it affected his romantic relationships with men, and his thoughts on loving yourself in order to allow others to love you. The afterword contains an anecdote about RuPaul meeting Diana Ross, a celebrity he describes idolizing throughout the book.
