= RuPaul =

American drag queen, actor and musician (born 1960)

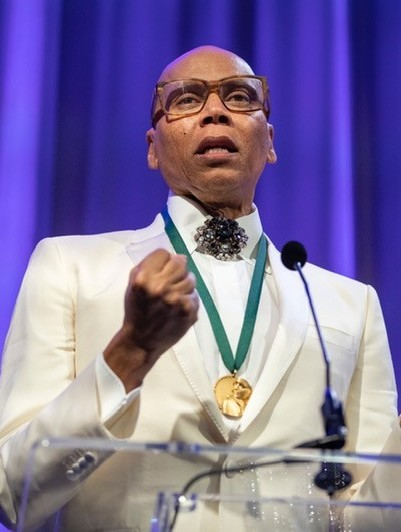
- RuPaul in 2019
- Born: RuPaul Andre Charles; November 17, 1960 (age 65); San Diego, California, U.S.
- Occupations: Drag queen; television host; singer; producer; writer; actor
- Years active: 1982–present
- Television: The RuPaul Show; RuPaul's Drag Race; Gay for Play Game Show Starring RuPaul; Good Work; Skin Wars; AJ and the Queen; RuPaul
- Spouse: Georges LeBar (m. 2017)
- Relatives: Cory Booker (distant cousin)
- Awards: Full list
- Musical career
- Genres: Pop; dance; disco house; R&B
- Instruments: Vocals
- Labels: Funtone; Every; Tommy Boy; Rhino; RuCo; World of Wonder
- Website: rupaul.com

RuPaul Andre Charles (born November 17, 1960) is an American drag queen, television host, singer, producer, writer, and actor. He (Note: RuPaul is indifferent to which gender pronouns are used to refer to him, stating that he can be called "he" or "she", and has played male roles and makes public appearances in both male and female drag. This article uses "he/him" pronouns for consistency.) produces, hosts, and judges the reality competition series RuPaul's Drag Race and has received several accolades, including 14 Primetime Emmy Awards and a Tony Award, in addition to two Billboard Music Awards, a Critics' Choice Television Award, five GLAAD Media Awards, and a Guinness World Records title. He has been dubbed the "Queen of Drag" and is considered the most commercially successful drag queen in the United States, with Fortune saying that he is "easily the world's most famous drag queen." In 2017, RuPaul was included in the annual Time 100 list of the most influential people in the world.

Born and raised in San Diego, California, RuPaul studied performing arts in Atlanta, Georgia, before relocating to New York City, where he became a popular fixture on the LGBTQ nightclub scene. He achieved international fame as a drag queen with the release of his debut single, "Supermodel (You Better Work)" (1993). RuPaul was a spokesperson for MAC Cosmetics in 1994, raising money for the Mac AIDS Fund and becoming the first drag queen to land a major cosmetics campaign.

RuPaul's Drag Race was created in 2009 and has gone on to produce eighteen seasons in the United States. The show has also seen success internationally and there are several international variants of the show, including RuPaul's Drag Race UK (2019–present) and Canada's Drag Race (2020–present). There are also several spin-offs of the main show, such as RuPaul's Drag U (2010–2012), RuPaul's Drag Race All Stars, (2012–present), and RuPaul's Secret Celebrity Drag Race (2020–2022). His other television work includes The RuPaul Show (1996–1998), Skin Wars (2014–2016), Good Work (2015), Gay for Play Game Show Starring RuPaul (2016–2017), and RuPaul (2019). In 2018, RuPaul received a star on the Hollywood Walk of Fame for his contributions to the television industry.

RuPaul has made appearances in films, including Crooklyn (1994), The Brady Bunch Movie, To Wong Foo, Thanks for Everything! Julie Newmar (both 1995), and But I'm a Cheerleader (1999), as well as television series, including Girlboss and Broad City (both 2017). He created and starred in the Netflix original series AJ and the Queen (2020). As a recording artist, RuPaul has released fifteen studio albums. He has also published four books: Lettin' It All Hang Out (1995), Workin' It! RuPaul's Guide to Life, Liberty, and the Pursuit of Style (2010), GuRu (2018), and The House of Hidden Meanings (2024).

== Early life ==
RuPaul was born in San Diego on November 17, 1960, the son of Ernestine "Toni" (née Fontenette) and Irving Andrew Charles. His parents were both from Louisiana. He was named by his mother; "Ru" came from roux, the French term for the base of gumbo and other creole stews and soups. According to DNA analysis by Finding Your Roots staff, his ancestry is 70% African and 30% European.

RuPaul was raised in a Catholic household and grew up poor in a "broken home" with an absent father and volatile mother. After his mother discovered his father was having an affair, she poured gasoline on his car and attempted to set the house on fire. He described this traumatic event as a "pivotal moment" which caused him to dissociate from his body and deeply impacted him. After his parents divorced in 1967, he and his three sisters lived with their mother. He attended Patrick Henry High School but dropped out in 10th grade. At 15, RuPaul and his sister Renetta moved to Atlanta, where they studied performing arts.

== Career ==
=== 1980–1995: Beginnings and Supermodel of the World ===
RuPaul struggled as a musician and filmmaker during the 1980s, working at Atlanta's Plaza Theatre. In 1982, he debuted on an Atlanta public access variety show called The American Music Show, and went on to appear on the show frequently. He also took part in underground cinema, helping create the low-budget film Star Booty and an album of the same name. In Atlanta he often performed at the Celebrity Club, managed by Larry Tee, as a bar dancer or with his band, Wee Wee Pole. RuPaul also performed as a backup singer to Glen Meadmore along with drag queen Vaginal Davis. His first prominent national exposure came in 1989, when he danced as an extra in the video for The B-52s' "Love Shack", and also appeared in Tom Rubnitz's video "Pickle Surprise".

In the early 1990s, RuPaul worked the Georgia club scene and was known by his full birth name. Initially participating in gender bender-style performances, he performed solo and in collaboration with other bands at several New York City nightclubs, most notably the Pyramid Club. He played opposite New York City drag performer Mona Foot (Nashom Benjamin) in the one-act science-fiction parody "My Pet Homo", written and directed by Jon Michael Johnson for Cooper Square Productions. He performed for many years at the annual Wigstock drag festival and appeared in the documentary Wigstock: The Movie. In the 1990s, RuPaul appeared on the UK Channel 4 series Manhattan Cable, a weekly series produced by World of Wonder and presented by American Laurie Pike about New York's public-access television system.

In 1993, RuPaul recorded the dance/house album Supermodel of the World. It was released through the rap label Tommy Boy, spawning the dance track hit "Supermodel (You Better Work)". The song peaked at 45 on the Billboard Hot 100. It charted on the UK Singles Chart, peaking on the top 40 at 39. The song found the most success on the Billboard Hot Dance Music/Club Play chart, where it peaked at 2. Radio airplay, heavy rotation of the music video on MTV, and television appearances on popular programs like The Arsenio Hall Show popularized the song. His next two singles/videos, "Back to My Roots" and "A Shade Shady (Now Prance)", both went to the top spot on the Billboard Hot Dance Music/Club Play chart. His following release "House of Love" failed to place on any U.S. charts but peaked at 68 on the UK Singles Chart. In 1994, he released "Don't Go Breaking My Heart", a duet with Elton John.

RuPaul was signed to a modeling contract for MAC Cosmetics. Various billboards featured him in full drag, often with the text "I am the MAC girl". He also released his autobiography, Lettin' It All Hang Out. He promoted the book in part with a 1995 guest appearance on ABC's All My Children, in a storyline that put it on the set of Erica Kane's talk show "The Cutting Edge". The same year, he was featured in his first of two appearances in the Brady Bunch movies, in which he played Jan's female guidance counselor. In 1994 he had a duet with Elton John who was of the superguests of the Sanremo Festival in Italy as superguests, one of the main festivals worldwide; the permance generated both positive and concerned reactions from the public.

=== 1996–2007: Foxy Lady and Red Hot ===
In 1996, he landed a talk show of his own on VH1, called The RuPaul Show interviewing celebrity guests and musical acts. Cher, Diana Ross, Nirvana, Duran Duran, Pat Benatar, Mary J. Blige, Bea Arthur, Dionne Warwick, Cyndi Lauper, Olivia Newton-John, Beenie Man, Pete Burns, Bow Wow Wow, and the Backstreet Boys were notable guests. His co-host was Michelle Visage with whom he also co-hosted on WKTU radio. On one episode, RuPaul featured guests Chi Chi LaRue and Tom Chase speaking about the gay porn industry.

Later in the year he released his second album, Foxy Lady, this time on the L.A.-based Rhino Records label. The album failed to chart on the Billboard 200. However, its first single "Snapshot" went to number four on the Hot Dance Music/Club Play chart. It also enjoyed limited mainstream success, charting at 95 on the Billboard Hot 100, which was his second and final solo Hot 100 entry to date. The album's second single "A Little Bit of Love" was not as successful, peaking at 28 on the Hot Dance Music/Club Play chart. During this time, RuPaul hosted a morning radio show at WKTU radio in New York City and would serve as host until 1998.

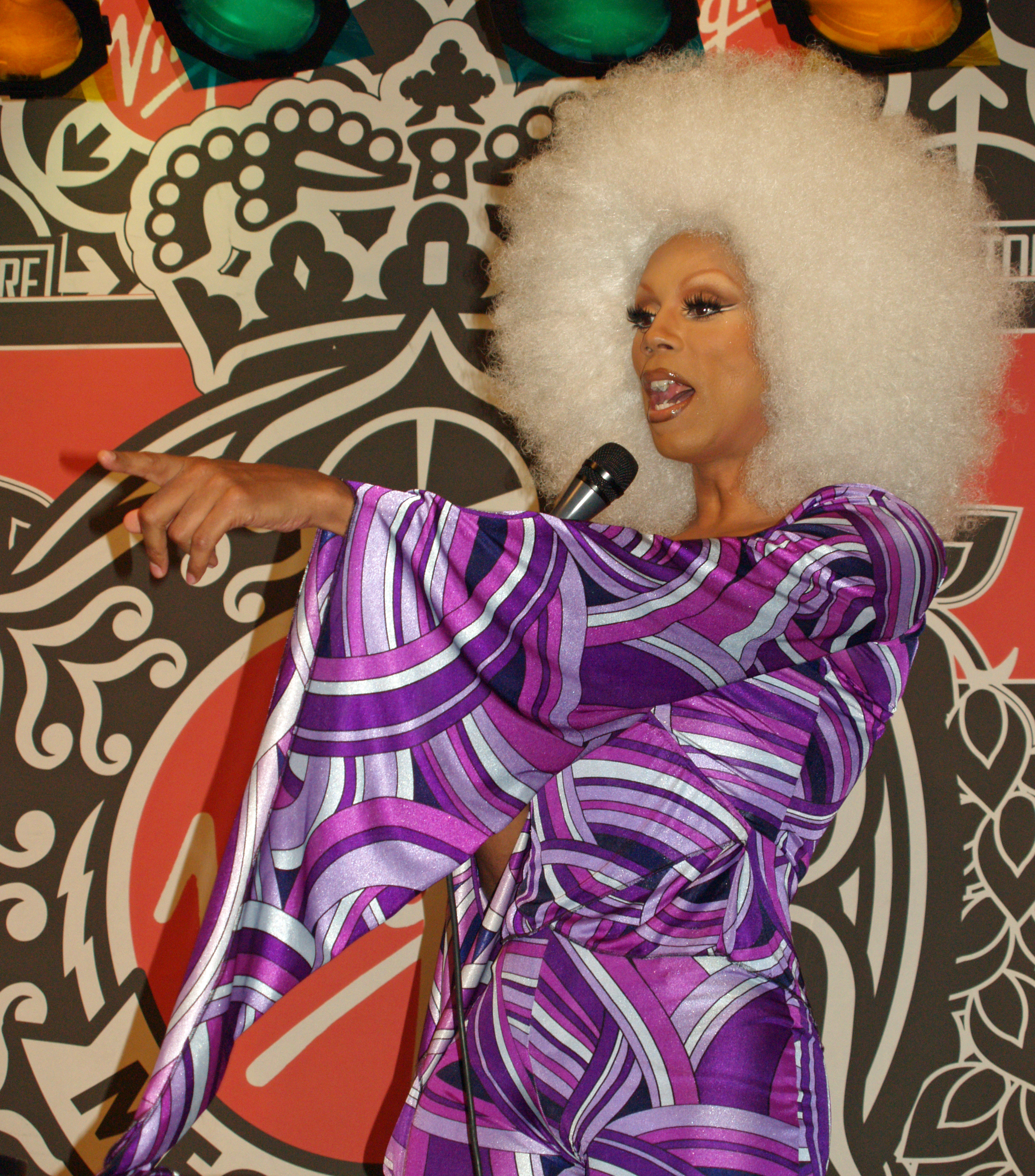
RuPaul in 2007

In 1997, he released his third album, the Christmas-themed Ho Ho Ho. That year, RuPaul teamed with Martha Wash to remake the classic disco anthem, "It's Raining Men". The song was included on the 1998 compilation CD RuPaul's Go Go Box Classics. During this time, he appeared in Webex TV commercials and magazine ads. In 2002, he was featured on the Eurodance track "You're No Lady" alongside Brigitte Nielsen.

In 2004, RuPaul released his fourth album, Red Hot, on his own RuCo Inc. music label. It received dance radio and club play, but very little press coverage. RuPaul later noted, "I don't know what happened. It seemed I couldn't get press on my album unless I was willing to play into the role that the mainstream press has assigned to gay people, which is as servants of straight ideals." Red Hot's lead single "Looking Good, Feeling Gorgeous" peaked at number two on the dance chart. The second, "WorkOut", peaked at number five. The third and final single from the album "People Are People" a duet with Tom Trujillo, peaked at number 10. The album itself only charted on the Top Electronic Albums chart, where it hit number nine. In September, he was hired at WNEW.

On June 13, 2006, RuPaul released ReWorked, his first remix album. The only single released from the album was a re-recording of "Supermodel (You Better Work)", which reached number 21 on the U.S. dance chart. June 20, 2007, saw the release of Starrbooty: Original Motion Picture Soundtrack in the United States. The single "Call Me Starrbooty" was digitally released in 2007. The album contains new tracks as well as interludes with dialogue from the movie. The film was released on DVD in October 2007.

=== 2008–2013: RuPaul's Drag Race, Champion, and Glamazon ===
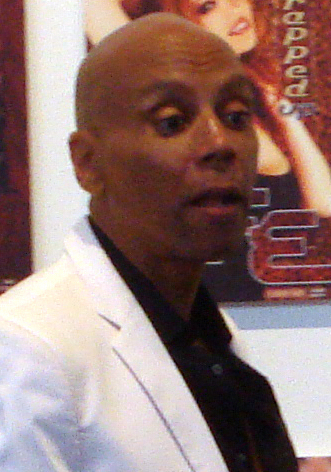
RuPaul in 2009

In mid-2008, RuPaul began producing RuPaul's Drag Race, a reality television game show which aired on Logo in February 2009. On the program drag queens compete to be selected by RuPaul and a panel of judges as "America's next drag superstar". The first season's winner was BeBe Zahara Benet, and first runner-up Nina Flowers was chosen by fans as "Miss Congeniality" through voting via the show's official website. To publicize the new show, RuPaul appeared on several other shows in 2008, including Project Runway, as guest judge, and on Paula's Party as a guest "chef".

In March 2009, RuPaul released the album Champion. The album spawned four singles "Cover Girl", "Jealous of My Boogie", "Devil Made Me Do It", and "Tranny Chaser". The album peaked at number 12 on the Billboard Dance/Electronic Albums as well as 26 on the Billboard Top Heatseekers chart. Logo's second annual NewNowNext Awards in 2009 were hosted by RuPaul. There he performed "Jealous of My Boogie (Gomi & RasJek Edit)". In March 2010, RuPaul released his second remix album, Drag Race, the album features remixes of songs from the 2009 album Champion.

In April 2011, coinciding with the finale of season 3 of RuPaul's Drag Race, RuPaul released his sixth studio album Glamazon, produced by Revolucian. The album charted on Billboard's Dance/Electronic Albums and the Billboard Top Heatseekers chart at 11 and 8 respectively. In July 2011, he released another remix EP entitled SuperGlam DQ which features remixes of tracks from Glamazon, remixes of the "Drag U Theme Song", and a new song, "Sexy Drag Queen". The second season of RuPaul's Drag U began in June 2011. In late 2011, RuPaul made appearances on The Rosie Show and The Chew, and also attended a Drag Race NY Premiere party at Patricia Field's store in New York. Season 4 of RuPaul's Drag Race premiered on Logo on January 30, 2012, with RuPaul returning as the main host and judge. In the fall of 2012, the spin-off RuPaul's Drag Race All Stars premiered and featured past contestants of the previous four seasons. Season 5 of RuPaul's Drag Race premiered on January 28, 2013. On April 30, 2013, he released "Lick It Lollipop" featuring Lady Bunny.

In fall of 2013, RuPaul joined forces with cosmetic manufacturers Colorevolution to launch his debut make-up line featuring ultra-rich pigment cosmetics and a beauty collection. Released alongside the line was a unisex perfume entitled "Glamazon". Talking to World of Wonder he said: "Glamazon is for women and men of all ages and preferences who share one thing in common: They are not afraid to be fierce. For me, glamour should be accessible to all, and I am committed to helping the world look and smell more beautiful." The line was exclusively sold on the Colorevolution website in various gift sets.

=== 2014–2016: Born Naked, Realness, Butch Queen, and television expansion ===
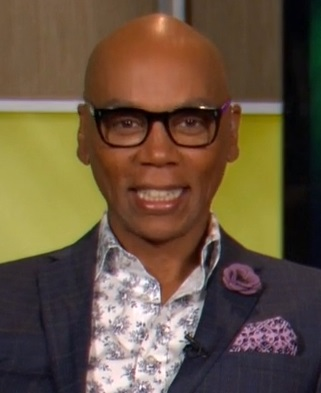
RuPaul in 2015

On January 28, 2014, RuPaul released RuPaul Presents The CoverGurlz, a collaborative album featuring new versions of RuPaul songs from 2009 to 2013. His seventh studio album, Born Naked, was released on February 24, 2014, to coincide with the premiere of the sixth season of RuPaul's Drag Race. Born Naked placed at number 4 on the US Billboard dance chart and 85 on the Billboard 200 chart. On April 9, 2014, RuPaul and Michelle Visage released the first episode of their podcast, RuPaul: What's the Tee? with Michelle Visage. In August, he joined the reality competition show Skin Wars acting as a judge.

On March 2, 2015, RuPaul released his eighth studio album, Realness. The release coincided with the premiere of the seventh season of RuPaul's Drag Race. In April, he launched and began hosting a new show, Good Work, a plastic surgery-themed talk show for E!. In October he released his second Christmas album, and ninth studio album, Slay Belles. The album contains ten original Christmas-themed songs and features collaborations with Michelle Visage, Siedah Garrett, Todrick Hall, and Big Freedia. The album charted at 21 on the US Billboard Dance chart.

In January 2016, it was announced RuPaul would present a new game show for Logo TV called Gay for Play Game Show Starring RuPaul which premiered on April 11, 2016, after RuPaul's Drag Race. In March 2016, he released his tenth album, Butch Queen, just prior to the premiere of the eighth season of RuPaul's Drag Race. A song from the album, "U Wear It Well" was featured in the teaser campaigns for the season and was released as its first single. The album charted at number 3 on the US Billboard Dance chart. "'Be Someone" featuring American singer Taylor Dayne was released as the album's second and final single. Additionally, Butch Queen: The Ru-Mixes was released.

In July 2016, it was announced that RuPaul was nominated for the Primetime Emmy Award for Outstanding Host for a Reality or Reality-Competition Program. He was presented the award at the September Creative Arts Emmy Awards Ceremony. 2016 also saw the release of the single "Read U Wrote U" that features rap parts by the RuPaul's Drag Race All Stars 2 finalists Roxxxy Andrews, Katya Zamolodchikova, Alaska Thunderfuck, and Detox Icunt with production by Ellis Miah.

=== 2017–present: Further album releases, Drag Race UK, AJ and the Queen, and further TV shows ===
On February 3, 2017, RuPaul released the album Remember Me: Essential, Vol. 1. It is a collection of new songs and remakes of RuPaul hits that feature new artists. Two singles were released from the album: "Rock It (To The Moon)", and an updated version of RuPaul's 1996 single "Snapshot" from Foxy Lady. The album debuted at number four on the Billboard Dance Albums Sales Chart in the United States and at number eleven on the UK Dance Albums Chart. On March 24, 2017, RuPaul released his eleventh studio album, American. On the same day, the ninth regular season of RuPaul's Drag Race debuted on basic cable channel VH1. It moved from the expanded cable channel Logo TV which aired all previous seasons of the show. The season 9 premiere featured singer Lady Gaga as its guest judge and was a success, with ratings of nearly 1,000,000 viewers, making it the series' most viewed episode.

On June 9, 2017, Essential, Vol. 2 was released. It was preceded by the single "Crying on the Dance Floor", a re-recording of the 2010 single "Main Event" from Champion. On March 16, 2018, RuPaul received a star on the Hollywood Walk of Fame for his contributions to the television industry. He was the first drag queen to be given the award. RuPaul released his third Christmas album in October 2018.

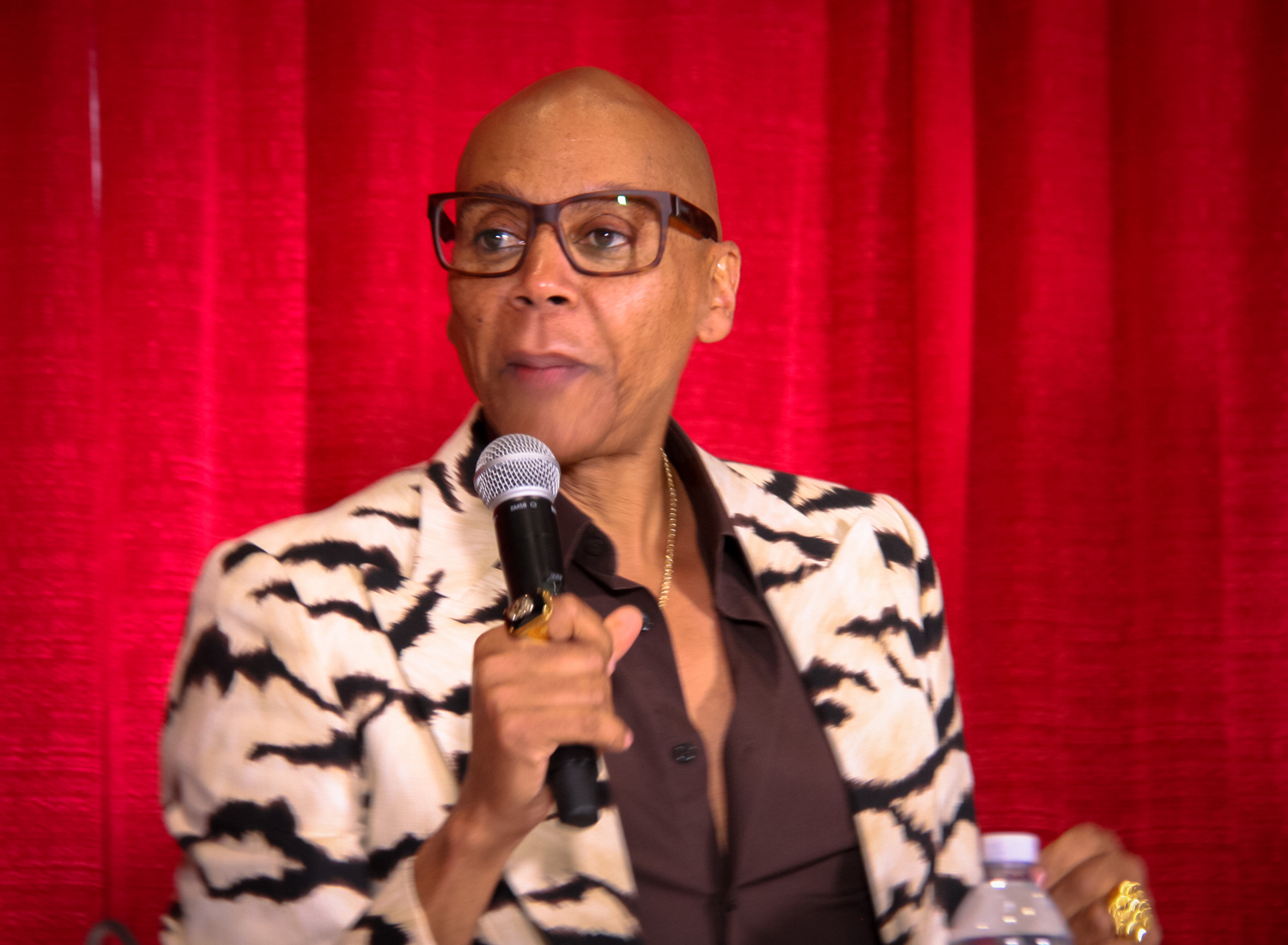
At RuPaul's DragCon LA 2019

In June 2019, the daytime talk show RuPaul premiered. It was cancelled after a three-week test run. He also appeared in Taylor Swift's "You Need to Calm Down" music video. In late 2019, the first season of RuPaul's Drag Race UK was released on BBC3. It was renewed for a second season which was released in 2021. RuPaul also created and starred in the Netflix drama-comedy show AJ and the Queen, which was released on January 10, 2020. On March 6, 2020, Netflix announced that the series had been cancelled. RuPaul hosted Saturday Night Live on February 8, 2020. On May 11, RuPaul made an appearance on The Price Is Right at Night. He also made an appearance in the premiere episode of Canada's Drag Race.

In August 2021, RuPaul guest hosted two episodes of the talk show Jimmy Kimmel Live!. He did voice work in Amphibia portraying the FBI agent Mr. X. He won the Tony Award for Best Musical in 2022 as a producer of the Broadway musical A Strange Loop. He also voices himself as the announcer on The Tiny Chef Show. He began hosting a revival of the game show Lingo for CBS in 2023, as well as Celebrity Lingo, a spinoff of the UK series of the same name on ITV.

HarperCollins published the RuPaul memoir The House of Hidden Meanings in March 2024.

== Other ventures ==
=== Podcasting ===
The podcast RuPaul: What's the Tee? With Michelle Visage debuted on April 6, 2014. Ru-Paul co-hosts with longtime friend and fellow RuPaul's Drag Race judge Michelle Visage. The weekly show features their thoughts on topics including behind-the-scenes of RuPaul's Drag Race, life advice, beauty tips, and conversations with featured guests from the entertainment world.

=== Audiobooks ===
In 2018, RuPaul was one of the actors who voiced the audiobook A Day in the Life of Marlon Bundo.

=== Drag conventions ===
Launched through production company World of Wonder, RuPaul's DragCon LA is an annual drag-themed convention held in Los Angeles which started in 2015, followed by RuPaul's DragCon NYC. It began in 2017 in New York City; the public is able to meet with RuPaul, former RuPaul's Drag Race contestants, and other drag queens. The conventions feature performances, meet-and-greet booths, merchandise sales and panel discussions.

=== Activism ===
RuPaul has been an active supporter of voter registration, producing a public service announcement supporting National Voter Registration Day and urging everyone to register. As RuPaul said voter ID laws vary from state to state; the details of the voter ID required in each state are provided by HeadCount and VoteRiders. As one in five LGBTQ adults are not registered to vote, voter registration efforts have expanded recently. Several stars from RuPaul's Drag Race act as Ambassadors for Drag Out the Vote.

In March 2023, in response to the Tennessee Adult Entertainment Act, RuPaul, World of Wonder producers Randy Barbarto and Fenton Bailey, and MTV began a fund to fight anti-drag initiatives. The ACLU maintains the fund, which received donations from efforts at DragCon LA 2023, the "Drag Isn't Dangerous" livestream telethon, "Can't Hold us Down", "Born This Way", and "God Save the Queens", as well as a small donation from the Manhattan Association of Cabarets.

The Instagram post RuPaul made prior to the establishment of the fund called on followers to vote, saying, "Register to vote so we can get those stunt queens out of office." The video ends with the statement, "By the way, a social media post has never been as powerful as a registered vote."

== Impact ==
Lauren Herold of Mic.com deemed RuPaul "arguably the most commercially successful drag queen in America." Sami Main of Adweek credited him with creating wider exposure for drag queens from LGBTQ culture into mainstream society, thanks to his early-career chart success, and later, the successive climb in viewership of RuPaul's Drag Race. His talk show The RuPaul Show was the first-ever national talk show to have a drag queen as a host. Along with his partner Michelle Visage, he welcomed an array of high-profile guests such as Cher, Lil Kim, and Diana Ross over the show's 100-episode span. As well as having a variety of comedy skits, the show was noted for discussing topics such as black empowerment, female empowerment, misogyny, and liberal politics that were otherwise unheard of in 1990s television at the time. In 1999, RuPaul was awarded the Vito Russo Award at the GLAAD Media Awards for work in promoting equality in the LGBTQ community.

RuPaul has also been noted as having a large part in RuPaul's Drag Race's continuous television success. By pioneering queer representation on television, many believe RuPaul to have essentially revolutionised the portrayal of the LGBTQ+ community on screen. He first won an Emmy for his work on the show in 2016, and one year later the show garnered eight nominations, including Primetime Emmy Award for Outstanding Reality Competition Program for the first time in its 11-season run, and a second consecutive win for RuPaul in the Primetime Emmy Award for Outstanding Host for a Reality or Reality-Competition Program. In 2017, he was included in the annual Time 100 list of the most influential people in the world. In 2019, Fortune noted RuPaul as "easily the world's most famous" drag queen.

=== Relationship with transgender community ===
RuPaul has been the subject of multiple controversies regarding his comments and actions towards the transgender community. According to Vox, he has a complicated relationship with this community, in part due to differing philosophies: through drag he seeks to mock gender and identity stereotypes, while in his view the trans community takes identity seriously. Nevertheless, RuPaul's Drag Race has featured a number of contestants who are trans women, including Kylie "Sonique" Love, Carmen Carrera, Jiggly Caliente, Monica Beverly Hillz, Kenya Michaels, and Gia Gunn, some of whom made their identity public while competing on the show. Later seasons of the show have included contestants who had already disclosed their trans identity prior to their season beginning. In 2017, Peppermint became the first contestant to compete throughout her season as an openly trans woman and in 2021 Gottmik was the first to compete as an openly trans man. Other non-conforming gender identities expressed by former contestants include both non-binary (Jinkx Monsoon, Aja, Valentina, Divina de Campo, Ginny Lemon, Violet Chachki, and Sasha Velour) and genderfluid (Courtney Act and Kelly Mantle) persons.

In 2014, trans activists and former contestants Carmen Carrera and Monica Beverly Hillz criticized the show's use of words such as tranny and shemale, including the main challenge announcement phrase up to season 6, "You've got she-mail", which they described as transphobic. That year's season also included a "Female or She-male" segment that required contestants to guess whether various photographs featured cisgender "biological women" or "psychological women" (drag queens), causing further criticism. RuPaul and the producers issued a statement promising "to help spread love, acceptance and understanding" and Logo TV removed the "You've got she-mail" phrase from subsequent broadcasts, replacing it instead with the phrase "She done already done had herses." RuPaul criticized those attempting to police his language in bad faith and noted that tranny referred to transvestites and drag queens, not just trans women.

In 2018, RuPaul gave an interview to The Guardian in which he stated that a post-transition trans woman would "probably not" be accepted onto the show, noting that at the time of competition Peppermint had not yet had breast implants. After facing criticism on social media and from former contestants for his remarks, RuPaul compared trans drag queens who had transitioned to athletes who had taken performance-enhancing drugs. He subsequently expressed regret for the hurt caused by his remarks, and that the only screening criteria for contestants were "charisma, uniqueness, nerve, and talent." Since RuPaul made these statements, multiple transgender contestants have competed and won on the show.

== Personal life ==
RuPaul met painter Georges LeBar in 1994 at the Limelight nightclub in New York City. They married in January 2017. They have an open marriage; RuPaul has said he would not want to "put restraints" on the person he loves. The two split their time between a home in Los Angeles and a 60,000-acre (24,000 ha) ranch in Wyoming. Environmentalists criticized them in 2020 after RuPaul revealed that they lease mineral rights and sell water to oil companies on their ranch, and allow fracking there. According to public maps, the ranch has at least 35 active wells. RuPaul previously held a climate-themed ball on his show to raise environmental awareness, leading to accusations of hypocrisy.

RuPaul publicly endorsed Democratic nominee Hillary Clinton in the 2016 United States presidential election. He expressed dismay at Clinton's defeat by Republican nominee Donald Trump, saying, "The America that we have all fought so hard for, the narrative of love and peace and liberty and equality, it feels like it is dead." He has described doing drag as a "very, very political" act because it "challenges the status quo" by rejecting fixed identities: "Drag says 'I'm a shapeshifter, I do whatever the hell I want at any given time'."

After nearly 30 years of struggling with substance abuse, in 1999, he decided to get sober and has not had alcohol, drugs, or tobacco since then. In 2020, he found out while appearing on the TV show Finding Your Roots that he and New Jersey Senator Cory Booker are "DNA cousins." In a 2013 interview, RuPaul said, "I'm not religious, but I do have spiritual practices like yoga and meditation and I do pray."

== Discography ==
Studio albums

- Supermodel of the World (1993)
- Foxy Lady (1996)
- Ho Ho Ho (1997)
- Red Hot (2004)
- Champion (2009)
- Glamazon (2011)
- Born Naked (2014)
- Realness (2015)
- Slay Belles (2015)
- Butch Queen (2016)
- American (2017)
- Christmas Party (2018)
- You're a Winner, Baby (2020)
- Mamaru (2022)
- Black Butta (2023)
- Essential Christmas (2023)

== Filmography ==
=== Film ===
Year	Title	Role
1987	RuPaul Is: Starbooty!	Starbooty
1994	Crooklyn	Connie
1995	The Brady Bunch Movie	Mrs. Cummings
1995	Wigstock: The Movie	Himself
1995	Blue in the Face	Dancer
1995	To Wong Foo, Thanks for Everything! Julie Newmar	Rachel Tensions
1995	Red Ribbon Blues	Duke
1995	A Mother's Prayer	Deacon "Dede"
1996	Fled	Himself
1996	A Very Brady Sequel	Mrs. Cummings
1998	An Unexpected Life	Charles
1999	EDtv	RuPaul
1999	But I'm a Cheerleader	Mike
2000	The Eyes of Tammy Faye	Narrator
2000	The Truth About Jane	Jimmy
2000	For the Love of May	Jimbo
2001	Who is Cletis Tout?	Ginger Markum
2005	Dangerous Liaisons	Himself
2006	Zombie Prom: The Movie	Delilah Strict
2007	Starrbooty	Starrbooty/Cupcake
2008	Another Gay Sequel: Gays Gone Wild	Tyrell Tyrelle
2016	Hurricane Bianca	Weather Man
2018	Show Dogs	Persephone (voice)
2019	Someone Great	Hype
2019	Trixie Mattel: Moving Parts	Himself
2021	The Bitch Who Stole Christmas	Hannah Contour
2021	Reno 911!: The Hunt for QAnon	Q
2022	Zombies 3	The Mothership (voice)
2023	Ozi: Voice of the Forest	Gurd (voice)
2023	Nimona	Nate Knight (voice)
2023	Trolls Band Together	Miss Maxine (voice)
2024	Hitpig!	Polecat (voice)
2026	Stop! That! Train!	President Judy Gagwell

=== Short films ===
Year	Title	Role
1983	The Blue Boy Terror	
1983	Wild Thing	
1983	Terror II	
1984	Terror 3D	
1986	Mahogany II	
1986	Psycho Bitch	
1986	American Porn Star	
1987	Voyeur	
1987	Police Lady	
1989	Cupcake	
1989	Vampire Hustlers	
1989	Beauty	
1997	Shantay	Shantay
1999	Rick and Steve: The Happiest Gay Couple in All the World	Daryl.com
2004	Skin Walker	
2006	Zombie Prom	Delilah Strict
2008	How We Got Over	
2019	Ru's Angels	Bos-Slay

=== Television ===
Year	Title	Role	Notes
1988	The Gong Show	Himself (out of drag)	
1993	Saturday Night Live	Himself (in drag)	Guest star, episode: "Charles Barkley/Nirvana"
1994	Sister, Sister	Marje	
1994	Sanremo Music Festival	Himself (in drag), duet with Elton John	Special performance
1995	In the House	Kevin	
1996–1998	The RuPaul Show	Himself (in drag)	Presenter, 100 episodes
1996–1998	Nash Bridges	Simone Dubois	2 episodes
1998	Hercules	Rock Guardian	Episode: "Hercules and the Girdle of Hyppolyte"
1998	Sabrina, the Teenage Witch	The Witch Judge / Hair Dresser	Episode: "Sabrina's Choice"
1998	Walker, Texas Ranger	Bob	Episode: "Royal Heist"
2001	Popular	Sweet Honey Child	
2001	Port Charles	Madame Alicia	
2001	Weakest Link	Himself (in drag)	
2002	Son of the Beach	Heinous Anus	credited as RuPaul Charles
2002	The Groovenians	Champagne Courvoisier	TV pilot
2006	Top Chef: San Francisco	as herself	"Food of Love." On Bravo. (March 15, 2006).
2008	Project Runway	Himself (in drag)	Guest judge, Season 5, episode 6
2009	Rick & Steve: The Happiest Gay Couple in All the World	Tyler	
2009–present	RuPaul's Drag Race	Himself (in and out of drag)	Host and judge
2010	Ugly Betty	Rudolph	Episode: "Chica and the Man"
2010–2012	RuPaul's Drag U	Himself (out of drag)	Host, judge and producer
2012–present	RuPaul's Drag Race All Stars	Himself (in and out of drag)	Host and judge
2013	Happy Endings	Krisjahn	Episode: "The Incident"
2013	Life With La Toya	Himself (out of drag)	
2013	Lady Gaga and the Muppets Holiday Spectacular	Himself (in drag)	Guest performer: "Fashion!" alongside Lady Gaga
2014	The Face	Himself (out of drag)	Guest judge
2014	Mystery Girls	Emillo	Guest star, episode: "Bag Ladies"
2014	The Comeback	Himself (out of drag)	Guest star, episode: "Valerie Films A Pilot"
2014–2016	Skin Wars	Himself (out of drag)	Judge
2015	Harvey Beaks	Jackie Slitherstein	Guest star, episode: "Harvey's Favorite Book"
2015	Good Work	Host	
2015	Bubble Guppies	RuPearl	Guest star, episode: "Costume Boxing"
2016	The Muppets	Himself (out of drag)	Episode: "Got Silk?"
2016–2017	Gay for Play Game Show Starring RuPaul	Host	
2016	The Real O'Neals	Himself (out of drag)	Episode: "The Real Thang"
2017	2 Broke Girls	Himself (out of drag)	Episode: "And the Riverboat Runs Through It"
2017	Animals.	Dr. Labcoat (out of drag)	Episode: "Humans"
2017	Girlboss	Lionel	Recurring role, 6 episodes
2017	Then and Now with Andy Cohen	Himself (out of drag)	
2017	BoJack Horseman	Queen Antonia	Episode: "Underground"
2017	Broad City	Marcel	3 episodes
2017	Adam Ruins Everything	Gil	2 episodes
2018	Drag Race Thailand	Himself (out of drag)	
2018	The Ellen DeGeneres Show	Himself (out of drag)	Season 15, episode 120
2018	The Simpsons	Queen Chante (voice)	Episode: "Werking Mom"
2019	The Bravest Knight	Stanley the Big Bad Wolf (in drag)	Two episodes
2019	The World's Best	Himself (out of drag)	Judge
2019	Grace and Frankie	Benjamin Le Day	Guest star
2019	RuPaul	Himself (out of drag)	Host
2019, 2021	Last Week Tonight with John Oliver	Himself	2 episodes
2019–present	RuPaul's Drag Race UK	Himself	Host and judge
2020	AJ and the Queen	Ruby Red	Main role; co-creator and executive producer
2020	Saturday Night Live	Himself/host	Episode: "RuPaul/Justin Bieber"
2020–present	RuPaul's Secret Celebrity Drag Race	Himself (in and out of drag)	Host and judge
2020	The Price Is Right at Night	Himself	Guest
2020–present	Canada's Drag Race	Himself (in drag)	Cameo (video message in every episode)
2020	Muppets Now	Himself (out of drag)	Episode: "Due Date"
2020–present	Drag Race Holland	Himself (in drag)	Cameo (video message)
2020	Earth to Ned	Himself (out of drag)	Guest; Episode: "You Better Work, Ned"
2021–2023	RuPaul's Drag Race Down Under	Himself	Host and judge
2021	Jimmy Kimmel Live!	Himself (guest host)	2 episodes
2021	Chicago Party Aunt	Gideon (voice)	8 episodes
2021	Drag Race Italia	Himself (guest)	Season 1: Episode 6
2021–2022	Amphibia	Mr. X (voice)	4 episodes
2021–2022	Painted with Raven	Himself (guest judge)	Episodes: "All That Sparkles", "Fairy Tale Ball"
2022–present	RuPaul's Drag Race: UK vs. the World	Herself (in and out of drag)	Host and judge
2022–present	Drag Race Philippines	Himself (in drag)	Cameo (video message in every episode)
2022–present	Canada's Drag Race: Canada vs. the World	Himself (in drag)	Cameo (video message in every episode)
2022	Ant & Dec's Saturday Night Takeaway	Himself	Star Guest Announcer (Series 18, Episode 1)
2022	The Late Late Show with James Corden	Himself	Guest Star (Season 7, Episode 1080)
2022	Celebrity Lingo	Himself	Host
2022	The Tiny Chef Show	Announcer (voice)	Main role
2023	The $100,000 Pyramid	Self – Celebrity Player	Episode: "RuPaul vs Lauren Lapkus and Steve Schirripa vs Loni Love"
2024	RuPaul's Drag Race Global All Stars	Himself	Host and judge

=== Music videos ===
Year	Title	Role	Artist
1989	"Love Shack"	Extra	The B-52's
2019	"You Need to Calm Down"	Himself	Taylor Swift

== Awards and nominations ==
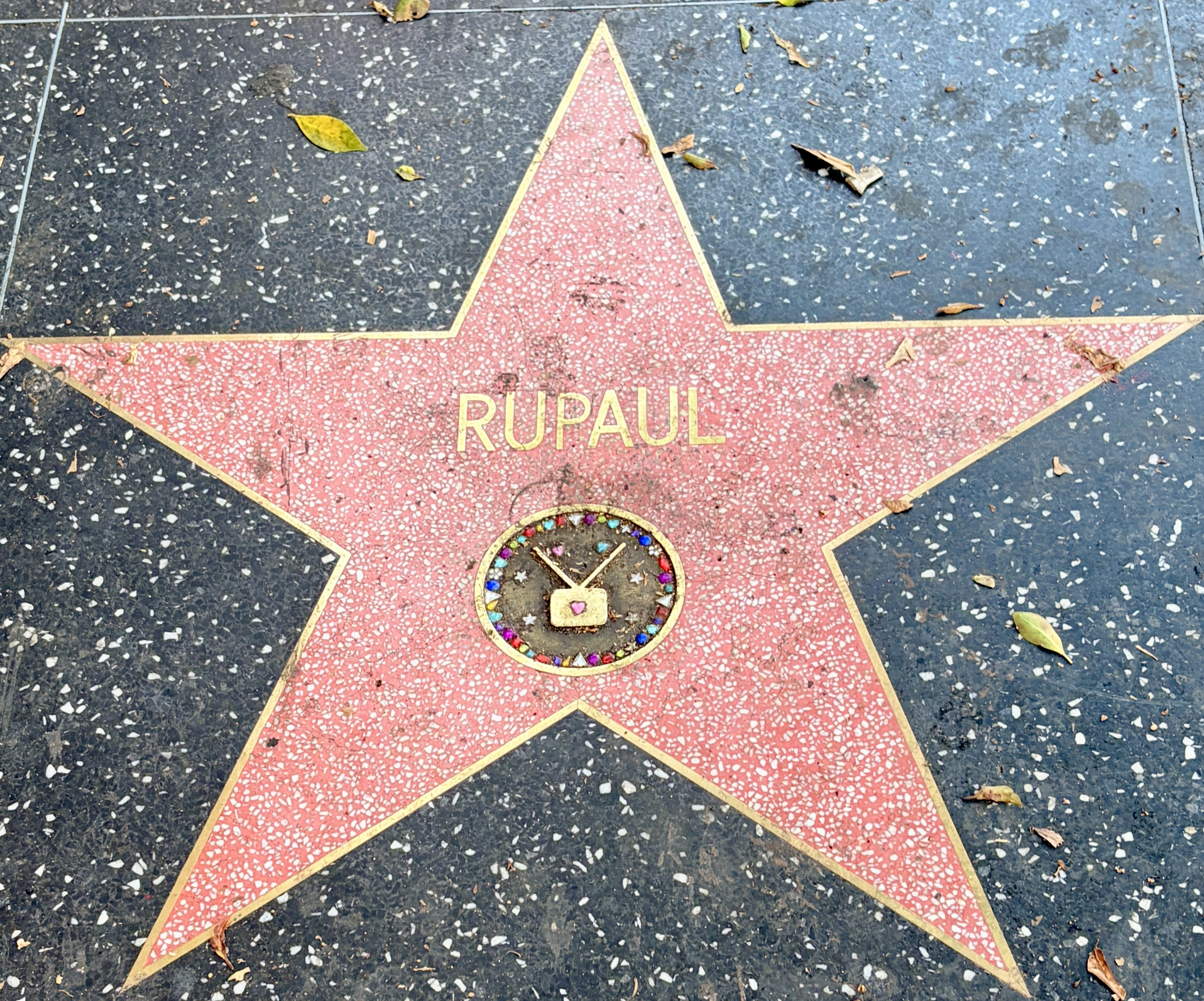
Hollywood Walk of Fame star

RuPaul has a star on the Hollywood Walk of Fame for which he was inducted in 2018. In 2019 he became the first drag queen inducted into the California Hall of Fame. He has also won 14 Primetime Emmy Awards, including 8 for Outstanding Host for a Reality or Competition program. This makes him the most awarded in the category as well as the most-awarded person of color in Emmy history. His other notable accolades include a Tony Award, two Billboard Music Awards, four Canadian Screen Awards, ten Critics' Choice Real TV Awards, a Critics' Choice Award, four GLAAD Media Awards including the GLAAD Vito Russo Award in 1999, five Producers Guild of America Awards, and a Guinness World Records title.

In 2020, a species of Australian soldier fly was named Opaluma rupaul. The name was chosen in reference to the fly's "costume of shiny metallic rainbow colours." Other species described in the same article were named O. ednae (after fellow drag queen Dame Edna Everage) and O. fabulosa.

== Books ==
- Lettin' It All Hang Out: An Autobiography. New York: Hyperion Books. June 1, 1995. ISBN 0-7868-6156-8. OCLC 31657240.
- Workin' It! RuPaul's Guide to Life, Liberty, and the Pursuit of Style. New York: It Books. January 1, 2010. ISBN 9780061985836. OCLC 435421683.
- GuRu. New York: Dey Street Books. January 1, 2018. ISBN 9780751573831. OCLC 1076520397.
- The House of Hidden Meanings: A Memoir. New York: Dey St. March 5, 2024. ISBN 9780063263901. OCLC 1388319009.

== See also ==
- LGBTQ culture in New York City
- List of LGBTQ people from New York City
- List of number-one dance hits (United States)
- List of artists who reached number one on the US Dance chart
- NYC Pride March
