= Jimmy Harry =

American musician

- Born: James Harry Nosanow; San Diego, California, United States
- Origin: United States
- Genres: Alternative rock; pop; dance-pop; electronic
- Occupations: Producer, songwriter, multi-instrumentalist
- Years active: 1993-Present
- Website: www.jimmyharry.com

Jimmy Harry is an American songwriter, producer, and multi-instrumentalist who currently resides in Los Angeles, California. Harry has worked with artists such as Madonna, Pink, Weezer, Kylie Minogue, Kelly Clarkson, Fischerspooner, Oh Land, and Santana. Recognized at the 2012 Golden Globes by the Hollywood Foreign Press Association, he won "Best Original Song" with Madonna and Julie Frost for the song "Masterpiece". In 2010, his production of Pink's "Sober" was nominated for a Grammy for "Best Female Pop Vocal Performance", and he also wrote and produced "Funhouse", the title track of her release nominated in the category "Best Pop Album". Jimmy received recognition from the Academy of Canadian Cinema & Television at the 2014 Canadian Screen Awards where he and Serena Ryder won "Best Original Song" for the song "It's No Mistake" from the film The Right Kind of Wrong.

== Producer and songwriter discography ==
Year	Artist	Album	Track(s)	Credit(s)
2026	LP (singer)	Room 12	"Heaven and Earth"	writing, production, multiple instruments
2026	LIZ	Prototyoe (Noteworthy)	"The L In Lover" "Juicy Sweet" "Likey" "Jus Wanna" "My Psychic" "Mercy"	writing, production, multiple instruments
2025	Band Of Silver	Break The Loop	"Break The Loop"	writing
2024	LIZ	Break The Loop (Noteworthy)	"Intuition Pt. 2"	writing, production, multiple instruments
2024	JC Chasez Jimmy Harry	Playing With Fire- World Premiere Recording(Centerstage Records)	"Album"	writing, production, multiple instruments
2024	Kate Pierson	Take Me Back To The Party (SongVest Records)	"Take Me Back To The Party"	writing, production, multiple instruments
2024	Fil Bo Riva	Black And Blue (Vertigo Berlin)	"Black And Blue"	writing
2024	Revenge Wife	Amore	"Amore"	writing, production, multiple instruments
2024	Bonsai Mammal feat. Liz	Supermodel(Kayvan Remix)(Armada)	"Supermodel"	writing, production, multiple instruments
2024	Ashley Kutcher	House On The Water (Darkroom/Interscope)	"Alone With Someone Else"	writing, production, multiple instruments
2023	James Hersey	Let It Shine (Sony Records)	"Let It Shine"	writing
2023	Michael Patrick Kelly	B.O.A.T.S (Extended Version) (Sony Records)(Ger #2)(Aus #2)(Swi #2)	"Two Mothers"	writing
2022	Nils Hoffmann, Malou	About You (Anjuna Deep)	"About You"	writing, production
2022	Malou	3 Nights In Venice (Warner Music Germany)	"3 Nights In Venice"	writing, production, multiple instruments
2021	Jazmine Flowers	Adulting (Island UK)	"Darth Vader"	writing, production, multiple instruments
2021	Jazmine Flowers	This Isn't Happiness (Island UK)	"This Isn't Happiness"	writing, production, multiple instruments
2021	Perttu, Da Tree Bunny & Strify	Go In (Curvature Records)	"Go In"	writing, production
2021	Bonsai Mammal feat. Mark Johns	Surrender (Armada)	"Surrender"	writing, production, multiple instruments
2021	Bonsai Mammal feat. Liz	Supermodel (Armada)	"Supermodel"	writing, production, multiple instruments
2020	Juliet Simms	All American (Sumerian Records)	"All American"	writing
2020	Eivør	Nothing To Fear (VOR)	"Segl"	writing, production
2020	Bonsai Mammal	Within Or Without You (Curvature)	"Within Or Without You"	writing, production, multiple instruments
2020	Syn Cole	Gold (Ultra)	"Gold"	writing, vocal production, guitar
2020	Simonne Jones	Abduction (Single)	"Abduction"	writing, production, multiple instruments
2020	Kiri T	Enemy (Single)(Kurious Grocery Ltd)	"Enemy"	writing, production, multiple instruments
2019	Autograf	Ain't Deep Enough (Single)(Armada)	"Ain't Deep Enough"	writing, production, multiple instruments
2019	Liz	Planet Y2K (Moving Castle)	"Intuition"	writing, production, multiple instruments
2019	Sebastian Paul	Boy Oh Boy (Mad Decent)	"WHO CARES"	writing, production, multiple instruments
2019	Woodes	Silent Disco (Single) (Believe)	"Silent Disco"	writing, production, multiple instruments
2019	Morgxn	Vital Blue (Wxnderlost Records)	"Harpoon"	writing
2019	Ra Ra Riot	Superbloom (Rob The Rich/Caroline)	"Dangerous"	writing
2019	Cray	Seasons Change And So Do I (Ultra)	"Can Live Without You"	writing
2019	LPX	Junk Of The Heart (LPX)	"Falling To Fall"	writing, production, multiple instruments
2019	Albin Lee Meldau	The Purgatory Sessions(Virgin Records)	"The Weight Is Gone"	writing
2019	Lena Meyer-Landrut	Only Love, L (Polydor) Ger#2	"Sex In The Morning"	writing
2019	Lostboycrow	Santa Fe (realname/Sony)	"Suburban Home"	writing, production, multiple instruments
2018	Lostboycrow	Scorpio (Single)	"Scorpio"	writing, production, multiple instruments
2018	Set Mo	See The Light (Single)	"See The Light"	writing, production, multiple instruments
2018	Bonsai Mammal	For You (Single)(Lowly Palace)	"For You"	writing, production, multiple instruments
2018	Brett Dennen	Already Gone (Single)(Downtown)	"Already Gone" (#3 Triple A)	writing
2018	Trace	Blood And Bones (Single)(Ultra/Sony)	"Blood And Bones"	writing, production, multiple instruments
2018	Albin Lee Meldau	The Weight Is Gone (Single)(Astralwerks)	"The Weight Is Gone"	writing
2018	Albin Lee Meldau	About You (Astralwerks)(#3 Swe)	"The Weight Is Gone"	writing
2018	Audra Mae	Love, Audra Mae (Single) (Audra Mae Records)	"Open Arms"	writing, production, multiple instruments
2018	Felix Jaehn	I (L'Argentur/Virgin) (Ger #5)	"On A Body Like You" "Book Of Love"	writing, production, multiple instruments
2018	Lostboycrow	Traveller: 3rd Legend	"Scorpio" "River Of Forgetfulness"	writing, production, multiple instruments
2018	Autograf	Dead Soon (Alt Vision/Casablanca)	"Dead Soon"	writing, production, multiple instruments
2018	Morgxn	Vital (Hollywood Records)	"Harpoon"	writing, production, multiple instruments
2018	XYLO	Don't Panic (Single)(Disruptor/Sony Music Entertainment)	"Don't Panic"	writing, production, multiple instruments
2018	Kandace Springs	Don't Need The Real Thing (Single)(Decca/UMG)	"Don't Need The Real Thing"	writing, production, multiple instruments
2018	Bonsai Mammal & Lils	Like Water (Single)(Curvature Records)	"Like Water"	writing, production, multiple instruments
2018	Bonsai Mammal & Mason Musso	Let Me Go When You're Ready(Single)(Curvature Records)	"Let Me Go When You're Ready"	writing, production, multiple instruments
2017	Fenech-Soler	Zilla (So Recordings)	"Be Someone"	writing
2017	Autograf	You Might Be (Single)(Big Beat/Atlantic Records)	"You Might Be"	writing, production, multiple instruments
2017	Garland Jeffreys	14 Steps To Harlem (Luna Park Records)	"When You Call My name"	writing
2017	Eden xo feat. Raja Kumari	Drips Gold (Single)	"Drips Gold"	writing, production, multiple instruments, mixing
2017	Somo	My Life III	"Hideaway Pt 1"	writing, production
2017	Gramercy feat. Penguin Prison	Unbelievable Love (Single)(Spinnin' Records)	"Unbelievable Love"	writing, production
2017	Michael Patrick Kelly	ID (Sony Records)(Ger #5)(Aus #7)(Swi #5)(Platinum)	"Lazarus"	writing, percussion
2017	Robin Schulz	Uncovered (Warner Music) (Ger #11)	"Love Me A Little"	writing, production, multiple instruments
2017	Lawrence Rothman	The Book Of Law (Downtown/Interscope)	"Your Kiss Tastes Like Dope"	writing, keyboards
2016	Clairy Browne	Pool (Vanguard Records)	"F.U.B." (#17 US Dance)	writing, production, multiple instruments
2016	Chløë Black	Groupie (RCA Records)	"Groupie"	writing
2016	Simonne Jones	Gravity E.P. (Universal Records)	"Abduction" "No One" "Spooky Action"	writing, production, multiple instruments
2016	Serena Ryder	Utopia (Universal Canada)	"It's No Mistake"	writing
2016	Daniel Wilson	Sinner Of The Week E.P. (AWAL)	"Sinner Of The Week"	writing, production, multiple instruments
2016	Kandace Springs	Soul Eyes (Blue Note Records) (US Jazz #5)	"Fall Guy"	writing
2016	Dirty Heads	Dirty Heads (Five Seven Music)(US #14)(US Alt #2)	"Doesn't Make You Right"	writing, production, multiple instruments, mixing
2016	Gemini	Wanderlust (Tree Of Life/KLS)	"Transcender"	writing, bass guitar
2015	Dawa	Feel Alive (Single)	"Feel Alive"	writing
2015	The Makemakes	The Makemakes (Aut #7)	"Big Bang", "I Am Yours"	writing, production, multiple instruments
2015	The Makemakes	I Am Yours (Single)	"I Am Yours"(Aut #2)(Aut Platinum)	writing, production, multiple instruments
2015	Holly Miranda	Holly Miranda (Dangerbird Records)	"The Only One"	writing
2015	Five Knives	FVKNVS (Red Bull Records)	"Shake My Bones"	writing
2015	Shawn Hook	Analogue Love (Universal Records)	"Who Do You Love"	writing, production
2015	Prides	The Way Back Up (Island UK/Universal Records)	"Linger On"	writing
2015	Miho Fukuhara	Something New (Sony)	"Broken Heart"	writing
2015	Diplo	Set me Free (Mad Decent)	"Set Me Free"	writing
2015	Peaches	Rub (I U She Music)	"Dumb F**K"	writing, production, multiple instruments
2015	Felix Jaehn	Book Of Love (Feat Polina) (Casablanca/L' Agentur (Universal Records)	"Book Of Love" (Ger #7/Airplay #1)(Plat)	writing, production, multiple instruments
2015	Ellie Drennan	Close Your Eyes (Universal Records) (Aus #14)	"Ghost" (Aus #25)	writing
2015	Chløë Black	Wild At Heart (RCA Records)	"Wild At Heart"	writing, multiple instruments
2014	Girl Radical	You And Me Against The World Single (Star Colony)	"You And Me Against The World"	writing, production, multiple instruments
2014	Christian Burns	Simple Modern Answers (Armada)	"Kick Out The Jams"	writing
2014	Mickey Guyton	The Right Kind of Wrong (film)	"It's No Mistake"	writing
2014	Anna F	King In The Mirror (Universal)	"DNA" "Friedberg" "Good Girl" " "Change It" "We Could Be Something"	writing
2014	Lo-Fang	Blue Film (4AD)	"When We're Fire"	writing, instrumentation
2014	Lena Fayre	Oko	"Gold Standard King"	writing, production, multiple instruments
2014	Jamosa	Love Ain't Easy (Avex)	"Dance" "King" "Endless love"	writing, production, multiple instruments
2014	Mrs. Greenbird	Postcards (Sony)	"The Lucky One"	writing
2013	Anna F	DNA (single) (Universal)	"DNA" (Ita #19)(Aus #15)(Ita Gold)(Amadeus Austrian Music Award Winner 2013)	writing
2013	Oh Land	Wish Bone (Federal Prism)	"Pyromaniac"	writing
2013	Diana Vickers	Music To Make Boys Cry (So Recordings)	"Mr Postman"	writing, production, multiple instruments
2013	Matt Cardle	Porcelain (Absolute)	"When You Were My Girl"	writing
2013	Diane Birch	Speak a Little Louder (S-Curve)	"Love And War"	writing
2013	Girl Radical	Don't Get Me Wrong Single (Star Colony)	"Don't Get Me Wrong"	writing, production, multiple instruments
2013	Hedley	Wild Life (Universal)	"Almost Over"	writing, production, multiple instruments
2011	Miho Fukuhara	The Soul Extreme EP II (Sony)	"Better Than Love"	writing, production, multiple instruments
2012	Madonna	"W.E." Soundtrack, {MDNA (Album)} (US#1)(US Gold)	"Masterpiece" (Rus #1)(Best Original Song Winner Golden Globes)	writing, production, multiple instruments
2011	Miho Fukuhara	The Soul Extreme EP 2 (Sony)	"Better Than Love"	writing, production, multiple instruments
2011	Miho Fukuhara	The Soul Extreme EP (Sony)	"Starlight"	writing, production, multiple instruments
2011	Jessie and the Toy Boys	Jessie and the Toy Boys (Prospect Park)	"Push It", "Valentine"	writing, production, multiple instruments
2011	Oh Land	Oh Land (Epic)	"Sun Of A Gun"	writing
2011	Zowie	Smash It (Sony)	"Smash It"	writing, production, multiple instruments
2011	Dia Frampton	The Red Album (Universal)	"Walkaway"(Thai #1)	writing
2010	Operator Please	Gloves (Brill Records/EMI)	"Gloves"	mixing, production
2010	Miho Fukuhara	Regrets Of Love (Sony)	"Forget"	writing, production, multiple instruments
2010	Vita Chambers	The Get Go (Universal/Motown)	"Like Boom", "The Get Go"	writing, production, multiple instruments
2010	Belinda	Carpe Diem (Capitol) (Mex #7) (Mex Gold)	"Egoista" (Mex #6)(US Latin #9), "Gaia", "Lolita", "Maldita Suerte"	writing, production, multiple instruments
2010	Weezer	Hurley (Epitaph) (US#6)	"Smart Girls"	writing, multiple instruments
2010	Miho Fukuhara	Regrets Of Love (Sony)	"Forget"	writing, production, multiple instruments
2010	Pink	Greatest Hits... So Far!!! (La Face) (US#5) Plat	"Sober"	production, multiple instruments
2010	Pink	Greatest Hits... So Far!!! (La Face) (UK #5) (UK 2× Platinum)	"Funhouse"	writing, production, multiple instruments
2009	Kylie Minogue	Boombox (Parlophone)	"Boombox"	writing, production, multiple instruments
2009	The Stunners	Bubblegum (Sony)	"Bubblegum"	writing, production, multiple instruments
2009	Natalie Bassingthwaighte	1000 Stars (Sony)	"This Can't Be Love"	writing, production, multiple instruments
2009	Days Difference	Days Difference (Universal/Motown)	"Are You Happy"	writing, production, multiple instruments
2009	All Time Low	Jennifer's Body Soundtrack (Fueled By Ramen)	"Toxic Valentine"	writing
2009	Vita Chambers	Like Boom (Universal/Motown)	"Like Boom"	writing, production, multiple instruments
2009	Amy Pearson	Butterfingers (Sony)	"Butterfingers"	writing, production, multiple instruments
2009	The Dares	Two Left Feet - EP (Sony)	"Two Left Feet"	writing
2009	Mozella	Belle Isle (Universal/Motown)	"Luvsik", "Manhattan"	writing, production, multiple instruments
2008	Amie Miriello	I Came Around (Jive)	"I'd Hate You"	writing, production, multiple instruments
2008	David Archuleta	David Archuleta (Jive)(US #2) (US Gold)	"Don't Let Go"	writing, production, multiple instruments
2008	Pink	Funhouse (Jive) (US #2) (US 2× Platinum)	"Sober"(US #15)(Ger #3)	production, multiple instruments
2008	Pink	Funhouse (Jive) (US #2) (US 2× Platinum)	"Funhouse" (Aus #6)	writing, production, multiple instruments
2006	Belinda	Utopia (EMI)(Mex #3) (Mex 2× Platinum)	"See A Little Light"(Mex #3), "Luz Sin Gravedad", "Good Good"	writing, production, multiple instruments
2006	Lisa Loeb	The Very Best Of Lisa Loeb (Geffen)	"Single Me Out"	writing, production, multiple instruments
2006	Kristy Frank	Freedom (Ruff Nation)	"Lift Off", "Bittersweet 16", "Quicksand"	writing, production, multiple instruments
2006	Rin'	Inland Sea (Avex)	multiple tracks	writing, production, multiple instruments
2006	Stefy	The Orange Album (Wind-Up Records)	"Chelsea", "Hey Schoolboy", multiple tracks	writing, production, multiple instruments
2005	Skye Sweetnam	Noise From The Basement (Capitol)	"Tangled Up In Me" (Ita #11) (Spn #11)	writing
2005	Santana	All That I Am (US #2) (US Gold))	"Cry Baby Cry" (Ita #19) (Arista)	writing
2005	Marion Raven	Here I Am (Atlantic)	Crawl	writing
2005	Sarah Bettens	Scream (Hybrid)	"Come Over Here"	writing
2005	Fischerspooner	Odyssey (Capitol)	"We Need A War"	writing
2004	Malú	Por Una Vez (Sony) (Spain #6) (Spain Platinum)	"Jugar Con Fuego (Take It Low)"	writing
2004	Ryan Cabrera	Take It All Away (Atlantic) (US #6) (US Platinum)	"True" (US #18), "Echo Park", "Exit To Exit"	writing
2004	Clay Aiken	Measure Of A Man (RCA) (US #1) (US 3× Platinum)	"No More Sad Songs"	writing
2004	Casey Donovan	For You (Sony/BMG) (Aus #2) (Aus 3× Platinum)	"Flow" (Aus #51)	writing
2004	Ho Yeow Sun	Without Love (single)	"Without Love" (US Dance #5 UK Dance #1)	writing, production, multiple instruments
2004	Kelly Clarkson	Breakaway (RCA) (US #2) (US 6× Platinum)	"I Hate Myself For Losing You"	writing
2003	Kelly Clarkson	Thankful (RCA) (US #1) (US 2× Platinum)	"Low" (Can #2) (Aus #11) (US Pop #14)	writing
2003	Britney Spears	In The Zone (Jive) (US #1) (US 2× Platinum)	"Touch Of My Hand"	writing, production, multiple instruments
2002	Amber	Naked (Tommy Boy)	The Need To Be Naked (#1 US Dance)	writing
2002	Felix da Housecat vs. Pop Tarts	Party Monster Soundtrack (Sony)	Money, Success, Fame, Glamour	writing, production, multiple instruments
2001	Krystal Harris	The Princess Diaries Soundtrack	"SuperGirl"	writing, production, multiple instruments
2001	Vitamin C	More (Elektra)	The Itch (Aus #6), Sex Has Come Between Us, Where's The Party	writing, production, multiple instruments
2000	Doro	Calling The Wild (Koch) (Ger #15)	"Terrorvision", "I Wanna Live", "Scarred"	writing, production, multiple instruments
1999	Doro	Love Me in Black (Warner Brothers) (Ger #38)	"Love Me In Black" "Brutal And Effective" "Do You Like It" "Terrorvision" "Prisoner Of Love"	writing, production, multiple instruments
1999	Vitamin C	Vitamin C (Elektra) (US #29 Platinum)	Fear Of Flying	writing, production, multiple instruments
1999	Lotus	Lotus	multiple tracks	writing, production, multiple instruments
1996	Whorgasm	Smothered (Rawkus)	all tracks	writing, production, multiple instruments, lead vocals
1996	Ophélie Winter	No Soucy (East West) (Fra #6) (platinum)	Le Feu Qui M'attise (Fra #7), Rien Que Pour Lu (Fra #39)	writing,
1994	Kylie Minogue	Kylie Minogue (BMG) (Uk#4) (Uk Gold)	"Put Yourself in My Place" (UK #11) (Aus #11), "If I Was Your Lover"	writing, production, multiple instruments
1993	RuPaul	Supermodel of the World (Tommy Boy)	"Supermodel" (#2 US Dance), "Back to My Roots" (#1 US Dance), "House of Love", "Supernatural", "All of a Sudden", "Stinky Dinky", "Free Your Mind"	writing, production, multiple instruments
1993	Mitsou	Tempted (TOX)	"Everybody Say Love", "Father Angel", "Koo Koo"	writing, production, multiple instruments
