= Planet Y2K =

Studio album by Liz
- Released: November 15, 2019
- Genres: Electropop; pop; R&B; Europop; trance; bubblegum pop; techno
- Length: 50:41
- Label: Moving Castle
- Producers: AOBeats; Dylan Brady; Ceci G; C.Z.; Groundislava; Jimmy Harry; Charlie Karlsfeld; Robokid; SONIKKU

Liz chronology
Cross Your Heart (2016)	Planet Y2K (2019)	Prototype (2026)

Singles from Planet Y2K
- 1. "Last Call" Released: November 16, 2018; 2. "Diamond in the Dark" Released: July 26, 2019; 3. "BTR 2GTHR" Released: August 28, 2019; 4. "Lottery" Released: September 25, 2019; 5. "Laguna Nights" Released: October 16, 2019; 6. "Intuition" Released: November 11, 2019; 7. "Cloudbusting" Released: March 20, 2020

Planet Y2K is the debut studio album by American singer Liz, released on November 15, 2019 through Moving Castle. Following a public falling-out with former record label Mad Decent in 2016, Liz released a one-track experimental pop mixtape called Cross Your Heart, and followed this with her first album, which she called "a culmination of a lot of work I did independently" Planet Y2K features "sonic flavors reminiscent of late 1990s / early 2000s Europop scene, with influences from various artists of that period including Britney Spears, Kylie Minogue, DJ BoBo, DJ Sammy, Spice Girls, Mandy Moore, Dream, Savage Garden, and Ace of Base.

== Music ==
The album opens with a trance-pop and techno cover of Kate Bush's 1985 hit "Cloudbusting". "Self-love anthem" "Diamond in the Dark" features vocals from American pop artist Slayyyter and production from Dylan Brady of 100 gecs. "Lottery" features American drag artist and rapper Aja and has been described as "sound[ing] like Britney Spears gone full hedonist". "Intuition" was described by the singer as "so bubblegum it's punk". The track was originally written by Jimmy Harry for Kylie Minogue in 1993, but was not released until Harry brought the demo to Liz. It features "moody synths, 1990s beats, and heart-on-your-sleeve lyrics". "Lost U 2 The Boys" is a song about a date gone wrong, inspired by the "island groove" of Ace of Base. The post-modern "Bubblegum" features "hyperspeed, chipmunk-sounding vocal effects, and rubbery production to back the campy, over-the-top lyrics".

== Track listing ==
No.	Title	Writer(s)	Producer(s)	Length
1.	"Cloudbusting"	Catherine Bush	Charlie Klarsfeld	2:59
2.	"BTR 2GTHR"	Aaron Joseph; Alex Chapman; Colby Zinser; Elizabeth Abrams; Jasper Patterson; Kim Petras	C.Z.; Groundislava	2:58
3.	"Diamond in the Dark" (featuring Slayyyter)	Abrams; Jarina De Marco	Dylan Brady	3:42
4.	"Laguna Nights"	Abrams; Ethan Budnick; Sam Shrieve; Tony Donson	Robokid	4:14
5.	"Intuition"	Jimmy Harry	Jimmy Harry	2:58
6.	"Mickey"	Abrams; Harry; Joshua Scott Chasez	Harry; SONIKKU	3:33
7.	"Bubblegum" (featuring Namasenda)	Abrams; Budnick; Naomi Namasenda; Sophia Black	Robokid	3:06
8.	"Cool with It"	Brady; Abrams; Black	Brady	2:17
9.	"Lottery" (featuring Aja)	Abrams; Jesse Saint John; Aja	AOBeats; Robokid	4:14
10.	"Electricity"	Andrew Bojanic; David Norland; Elizabeth Hooper	AOBeats	3:21
11.	"Everybody"	Daniel Peyer; Joe South; René Baumann	Klarsfeld	2:48
12.	"Lost U 2 the Boys"	Abrams; Budnick; Shrieve	Robokid	2:25
13.	"Mood Ring" (featuring Ravenna Golden)	Cecilia Gomez; Abrams; Budnick; De Marco; Ravenna Kerr-Grant	Ceci G; Robokid	3:22
14.	"Hearts Don't Break"	Gomez; Abrams; Budnick; Nicole Morier	Ceci G; Robokid	3:59
15.	"Baby Blue"	Karlsfield; Abrams; Shrieve	Klarsfeld	2:12
16.	"Last Call (Afterparty Mix)"	Andrew Okamura; Abrams; Budnick; Joel Gardner; Chasez	AOBeats; Robokid	3:24
Total length:				50:41
