= Adam Ross =

Adam Ross may refer to:

- Adam Ross (author) (born 1967), American novelist and short story writer
- Adam Ross (CSI: NY), a fictional character on the television series CSI: NY
- Adam Ross (musician), Los Angeles–based guitarist, songwriter, and producer
- Adam Ross, frontman of the Scottish indie-pop band Randolph's Leap (band)

== See also ==
- Adam of Ross (fl. 1279), Irish Cistercian monk
