= Hey School Boy =

Single by Stefy

from the album The Orange Album
- Released: November 6, 2006
- Recorded: 2006
- Genre: Pop; electronic rock
- Length: 3:29
- Label: Wind-Up Records
- Songwriters: Jimmy Harry; Mimi Jacobson; Stefy Rae
- Producer: Jimmy Harry

Stefy singles chronology
"Fool for Love" (2006)	"Hey School Boy" (2006)

"Hey School Boy" is a song recorded by American pop rock band Stefy. It was released as the second single from their debut album, The Orange Album (2006), on November 6, 2006. The track was written by Stefy-lead singer Stefy Rae, with Jimmy Harry and Mimi Jakobson, while production was handled by the former. Musically, the single is a pop and electronic rock-influenced with lyrics discussing "finding love" in a schoolboy.

After its release, "Hey School Boy" received generally positive reviews from critics, who appreciated the change in direction from previous single "Chelsea". Unlike "Chelsea", the single was not commercially successful and did not manage to peak on any significant record chart. Two music videos were created for the song in late 2006.

== Music videos ==
Two different music videos were created for "Hey School Boy". The first video for the song was released on November 6, 2006, and features Stefy Rae in a window display while auditioning guys for the group's video. Other scenes show her and the band performing the song in a warehouse. It was directed by videographer Nigel Dick. A second video, promoted by a contest dubbed "15 Seconds of Fame with Stefy", was released on December 27, 2006, alongside a special Stefy special on MTV2. The contest consisted of fans submitting dance moves to the video-sharing website YouTube for inclusion during the video. Winners would receive a Nokia 6133 phone, plus their clips featured in the video.

== Track listing ==
Digital download
No.	Title	Length
1.	"Hey School Boy"	3:29
