= Namasenda =

Swedish singer and songwriter

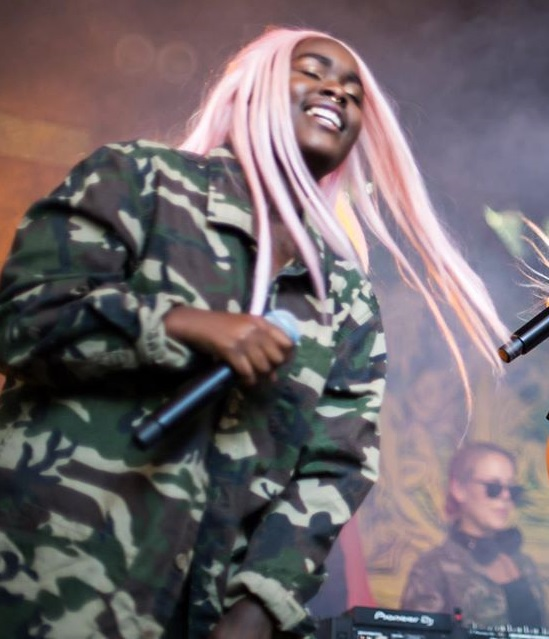
- Namasenda performing in 2017

Background information
- Born: Naomi Namasenda; November 14, 1993 (age 32); Jämshög, Blekinge, Sweden
- Genres: electropop; hyperpop; dance pop; experimental pop
- Occupation: Singer
- Instrument: Vocals
- Years active: 2011—present
- Labels: Year0001; PC Music (former)

Naomi Namasenda (born 14 November 1993), known mononymously as Namasenda, is a Swedish singer and songwriter from Stockholm. She is best known for releases on British pop and electronic label, PC Music.

== Early life and music career ==
Naomi Namasenda was born in Sweden to Ugandan parents in 1993 or 1994. In 2012, she was awarded a vocal scholarship by the Hollywood Chamber of Commerce. She graduated from the Musicians Institute and moved back to Sweden to work on new music and released her debut single "Here" in 2016, featuring BFOTY. There, she was hand picked as a breakthrough act by Red Bull Select. In 2017, she released her debut EP, Hot_Babe_93, and presented awards at the Grammis.

In 2019, with the release of her single "24/7", she became the first Black artist to sign to PC Music. In the same year she featured on US singer Liz's Planet Y2K album. She released "Dare (AM)" and "Dare (PM)" in April 2020, both singles produced by A. G. Cook, followed by "Wanted" in November 2020.

Namasenda released "Demonic", "Banana Clip", "Finish Him", and "No Regrets" as singles off of her debut mixtape, Unlimited Ammo, which was released on 28 October 2021. In October 2023, Namasenda released her EP Ambrosia via independent Swedish label Year0001, supported by the single "Maserati". In 2026, she released the singles "Cola" and "Miami Crest." Her debut studio album, Limbo, was released on May 8, 2026.

== Discography ==
=== Studio albums ===
Title	Details
Limbo	Released: 8 May 2026; Label: Year0001; Formats: LP, CD, digital download, streaming

=== Mixtapes ===
Title	Details
Unlimited Ammo	Released: 28 October 2021; Label: PC Music; Formats: LP, CD, digital download, streaming

=== Remix albums ===
Title	Details
Unlimited Ammo: Infinity (Remix)	Released: 8 April 2022; Label: PC Music; Formats: Digital download

=== EPs ===
Title	Details
Hot_Babe_93	Released: 22 September 2017; Label: Self-released; Formats: Digital download, streaming
Ambrosia	Released: 5 October 2023; Label: Year0001; Formats: Digital download, streaming

=== Singles ===
Title	Year	Album
"Here" (featuring BFOTY)	2016	Hot_Babe_93
"Ok Bye"	2017	Hot_Babe_93
"24/7"	2019	Non-album single
"Dare (AM)"	2020	PC Music Volume 3
"Dare (PM)"	2020	Non-album single
"Wanted"	2020	Non-album single
"Demonic" (featuring La Zowi)	2021	Unlimited Ammo
"Banana Clip" (featuring Mowalola)	2021	Unlimited Ammo
"Finish Him" (featuring Joey LaBeija)	2021	Unlimited Ammo
"No Regrets"	2021	Unlimited Ammo
"Maserati"	2023	Ambrosia
"Cola"	2026	Limbo
"Miami Crest"	2026	Limbo
"Bad Love"	2026	Limbo

=== Other appearances ===
Title	Album	Artist(s)	Year
"Bubblegum"	Planet Y2K	Liz	2019
"I Could Die"	Year0001 – Rift One	—N/a	2020
"The Ultra Intro"	Babycasey: ultra	Casey MQ	2021
"Lost"	Year0001 – Rift Two	—N/a	2023
"Yes"	The One After Me	Seinabo Sey	2023
"Solar Plexus"	I've Seen The Lizard People	Chi	2023
"giirL math"	v.i.p. - very important pony	horsegiirL	2025
"No Enemies"	—N/a	Sebastian Ingrosso & Steve Angello	2025
