= Mutha Is Half a Word =

Studio album by LaWanda Page
- Released: 1971
- Recorded: 1970
- Genre: Comedy
- Label: Laff

LaWanda Page chronology
Mutha Is Half a Word (1971)	Watch It, Sucker! (1972)

Mutha Is Half a Word is the debut album by American comic and actress LaWanda Page, released in 1971 on the Laff Records label.

== Description ==
Some of Page's most famous stand-up monologues are included on the album, including "The Blind Woman" and "Smell the Sardines", routines that she performed on television later in her career.

== Track listing ==
1. "Husbands & Whores"
2. "The Desk Clerk"
3. "Yo-Yo"
4. "Vice Squad"
5. "Three Pregnant Prostitutes"
6. "Two Winos"
7. "Sampson"
8. "69 to 88"
9. "The Preacher & the Funeral"
10. "All but Wipin'"
11. "The Pilot"
12. "Daddy's Nuts"
13. "Two Cowboys"
14. "Santa Claus"
15. "Madam & Her Daughters"
16. "The Milk Company"
17. "The Train"
18. "The Owl"
19. "The Chinaman"
20. "Adam & Eve"
21. "Assault"
22. "Son in the Morning"
23. "The Drunk & the Bartender"
24. "Hole in the Head"
25. "Banging the Blinds"
26. "Winchester Cathedral"
27. "Mother Frocker"
28. "The Sheep"
29. "The Blind Woman"
30. "Smell the Sardines"
