= Preach On Sister, Preach On! =

Studio album by LaWanda Page
- Released: 1973
- Recorded: 1972
- Genre: Comedy
- Label: Laff

LaWanda Page chronology
Watch It, Sucka! (1972)	Preach On Sister, Preach On! (1973)	Pipe Layin' Dan (1973)

Preach On Sister, Preach On! is the third solo album by American comic and actress LaWanda Page, her fourth release overall (including a collaboration album with the comic duo Skillet & Leroy under the title Back Door Daddy) under the eponymous stage name of LaWanda.

Page revisited the raunchy preacher monologues first introduced on her most popular release, Watch It, Sucker!, including explicit-laden routines on classic Bible stories.

As with her previous albums, Page is introduced as "the queen of comedy."

== Track listing ==
1. "Adam and Eve"
2. "Methuselah"
3. "Moses"
4. "Sampson and Delilah"
5. "David and Goliath"
6. "Elijah"
7. "Jeremiah"
8. "Paul"
9. "Brother Harold"
10. "Can I Get an Amen!"
11. "Dog Fashion"
12. "The Good Hoe"
13. "Virgins"
14. "Rachel"
