= Back to My Roots =

1993 single by RuPaul

Single by RuPaul

from the album Supermodel of the World
- Released: April 27, 1993
- Genre: Dance; house; pop
- Length: 3:32 (album version)
- Label: Tommy Boy
- Songwriters: RuPaul Charles; Jimmy Harry; Eric Stephen Kupper

RuPaul singles chronology
"Supermodel (You Better Work)" (1992)	"Back to My Roots" (1993)	"A Shade Shady (Now Prance)" (1993)

Music video
- "Back to My Roots" on YouTube

"Back to My Roots" is a song by American dance music singer and drag queen RuPaul, released as the fourth single from his album Supermodel of the World, released on April 27, 1993 by Tommy Boy Records. Although the single failed to chart on the US Billboard Hot 100, it reached number one on the Billboard Hot Dance Club Play chart in July 1993 and helped to further establish RuPaul's popularity, particularly with both the dance music and LGBT audiences in the United States.

The house/dance track is a tribute to black women's hairstyles as well as to the tradition of community often found in urban hair salons. The song was originally entitled "Black to My Roots", but the record company changed it fearing controversy. Within the song RuPaul name-checks a variety of hairstyles such as braids, hair extensions, afro-puffs and cornrows. She also names several of her relatives including her mother Ernestine Charles, who at the time owned a hair salon in Atlanta, Georgia.

The single was released primarily as a CD but with various 12-inch versions. It also featured a new remix of the hit single "Supermodel (You Better Work)", as well as a pastiche of the track called "Strudelmodel", which changed the theme of the original to a "model for the Der Wienerschnitzel Corporation". "Back to My Roots" was nominated in the category for Dance at the NAIRD 1994.

== Critical reception ==
Larry Flick from Billboard magazine described "Back to My Roots" as "a festive house ditty that extolls the creativity of African-American hair fashion." He added, "Eric Kupper's production is heavy on smart beats and disco charm, while Ru unleashes a flood of charisma and funny raps. An instant club hit poised for radio success." Pan-European magazine Music & Media wrote, "The man who looks like a reincarnation of the late Josephine Baker is still on the air with his uncle Elton duet, and he remains where his "date" took him back: in a good old '70s disco." Sam Wood from Philadelphia Inquirer felt the song succeed at "being more than celebrations of surface". Rupert Howe from Select remarked "the tongue-in-cheek camp of 'Back to My Roots' (his hair, of course, not his genealogy)".

== Music video ==
The accompanying music video for "Back to My Roots" showcased extreme drag versions of all of these hairstyles. Though it was played occasionally on MTV, it received far more play in dance clubs. It also featured noted comedian LaWanda Page as Ms. Ernestine Charles.

== Track listing ==
(Tracks vary according to release; this listing reflects the tracks on the American CD version, which sold the most copies.)

1. "Back to My Roots" (7" version)
2. "Back to My Roots" (Jheri Curl Juice Mix)
3. "Back to My Roots" (Murk's Curl Activator Mix)
4. "Supermodel (You Better Work)" (Work It Mr. DJ Tribal Mix)
5. "Back to My Roots" (Oscar G's Dope Dub)
6. "Back to My Roots" (Jheri Curl Juice Dub)
7. "Strudelmodel"

Italian promo vinyl (listed as "Back to My Roots - Remix")

Side One (Secchi Side):

1. "Back to My Roots" (Secchi's Extended Mix) [6:05]

Side Two (Statement Side):

1. "Back to My Roots" (Back to Our Concept Mix) [6:16]
2. "Back to My Roots" (Back to Our Concept Mix - Instrumental) [6:16]

== Charts ==
Chart performance for "Back to My Roots"
Chart (1993)	Peak position
Australia (ARIA)	90
UK Singles (OCC)	40
US Bubbling Under Hot 100 (Billboard)	6
US Dance Club Songs (Billboard)	1
US Maxi-Singles Sales (Billboard)	1
