= John Tucker Must Die =

2006 film by Betty Thomas

- Theatrical release poster
- Directed by: Betty Thomas
- Written by: Jeff Lowell
- Produced by: Bob Cooper; Michael Birnbaum
- Starring: Jesse Metcalfe; Brittany Snow; Ashanti; Sophia Bush; Arielle Kebbel; Jenny McCarthy
- Cinematography: Anthony B. Richmond
- Edited by: Matt Friedman
- Music by: Richard Gibbs
- Production companies: Landscape Productions; Dune Entertainment; Major Studio Partners; John US Productions
- Distributed by: 20th Century Fox
- Release date: July 28, 2006
- Running time: 89 minutes
- Countries: United States; Canada
- Language: English
- Budget: $18 million
- Box office: $68.8 million

John Tucker Must Die is a 2006 teen comedy film directed by Betty Thomas and starring Jesse Metcalfe, Brittany Snow, Ashanti, Sophia Bush, Arielle Kebbel, and Jenny McCarthy. The plot centers around a trio of teenage girls who plan to break the heart of school basketball star John Tucker (Metcalfe) after they learn he has been secretly dating all three and pledging each is "the one". They recruit a shy, unpopular girl (Snow) in their scheme to publicly humiliate him. The story is loosely based on William Shakespeare's The Merry Wives of Windsor.

Released theatrically by 20th Century Fox on July 28, 2006, John Tucker Must Die received mixed reviews from critics, who praised the cast's performances but called the film derivative. The film was a box office success, grossing $68.8 million worldwide against an $18 million budget.

== Plot ==
Teenager Kate Spencer lives with her single mother, Lori. While waiting tables at work, Kate sees popular local boy John Tucker on dates with three different girls: chronic overachiever Carrie, head cheerleader Heather, and promiscuous liberal vegan activist Beth. She learns from a co-worker that he dates girls from different cliques at his school so that they never interact. John convinces the girls to keep their relationships secret by claiming he is forbidden to date during basketball season.

The three girls learn about John's scheme after ending up on the same volleyball team in gym class. They meet Kate in detention, and after discovering she's able to see through him, the girls enlist her help in seeking revenge against John.

Meanwhile, Kate becomes friends with John's brother Scott. The girls make several attempts to bring John down, but these initial pranks backfire. He breaks up with all three girls, and they agree that breaking his heart is the ideal revenge. They enlist Kate to be the heartbreaker.

After a makeover, Kate joins the cheerleading squad to get John's attention. He tries to flirt with her, but she dismisses him. John is dismayed that a girl is impervious to his charms, and becomes determined to win her affections. He relentlessly chases after Kate, even driving by her house, much to the girls' amusement as they watch him fall for her.

After a few dates, Beth notices that Kate is falling for John. To counteract this, Carrie secretly videotapes John bragging to his friends in the locker room, saying he will be "scoring more than baskets" at the upcoming away game. Upon seeing his chauvinistic behavior, Kate recommits to the plan.

At a hotel on the night of the away game, Kate seduces John on a video-chat, instructing him to put on a lacy pair of girl's thong panties and climb out of his room and into hers. He mistakenly climbs into a teacher's room instead, and becomes the laughing stock of the school. John again uses this to his advantage, convincing the boys on his team that wearing the thong panties improves his game. Meanwhile, Kate's mother and Scott both discover the plan and lament the change in Kate's behavior.

Kate tells John that she heard about what he said in the locker room. He makes amends by giving her his watch and asking her to be his girlfriend. Kate tells Heather, Carrie, and Beth that she wants to be out of the plan, as whether they are dating or plotting to destroy John, it is still all about him. At John's birthday, the tape the girls made of John's destruction is played, and Kate reveals the entire plot in front of a devastated John.

Heather, Beth, and Carrie defend Kate after a guest throws his drink at her. Still, John appears unfazed, and the party devolves into a cake fight. A few days later, he and Kate agree to be friends, and he resolves to be honest. Scott, happy that Kate confessed, becomes her lab partner again, and it is hinted they will begin dating.

== Cast ==
- Jesse Metcalfe as John Tucker
- Brittany Snow as Kate Spencer
- Ashanti as Heather Montgomery
- Sophia Bush as Beth McIntyre
- Arielle Kebbel as Carrie Schaeffer
- Penn Badgley as Scott Tucker
- Fatso-Fasano as Tommy
- Jenny McCarthy as Lori Spencer
- Patricia Drake as Coach Williams
- Taylor Kitsch as Justin
- Kevin McNulty as Basketball Coach
- Amber Borycki as Jennifer
- Meghan Ory as Jill
- Greg Cipes as Guy at Party
- Samantha McLeod as Holly
- Nicole LaPlaca as Molly
- People in Planes as themselves

== Music ==
Music from the Motion Picture: John Tucker Must Die

Soundtrack album by Various artists
- Released: July 18, 2006
- Label: Wind-up
- Producer: Various producers

From April 6, 2006 to April 24, 2006, unsigned artists were allowed to submit their music for an online contest on MySpace called The John Tucker Must Die Undiscovered Band Contest. The winning band's song was eligible for inclusion in the movie and on the soundtrack. From these initial submissions, 20 semi-finalists were chosen by members of the MySpace staff. On May 1, 2006, those 20 bands relied on the support of their own fan bases, or MySpace 'friends,' to determine the top 10 finalists who were selected on May 19, 2006. The grand prize winner was chosen on May 26, 2006 by a panel of celebrity judges and music executives. Texas pop/punk band Rockett Queen's song "Next Big Thing" was chosen as the grand prize winner.

The John Tucker Must Die Undiscovered Band Contest was hosted by Stefy Rae of the band Stefy. Stefy's Wind-up Records debut was released on August 29, 2006. Two songs from the female-fronted band Stefy were featured in the film as well as songs from The All-American Rejects, Nada Surf, Ben Lee, OK Go, People in Planes, and Motion City Soundtrack, among others.

=== Track listing ===
| No. | Title | Writer(s) | Producer(s) | Length |
|---|---|---|---|---|
| 1. | "Dirty Little Secret" (The All-American Rejects) | Tyson Ritter; Nick Wheeler | Howard Benson | 3:16 |
| 2. | "Honestly" (Cartel) | Will Pugh (lyrics); Cartel (music) | Zack Odom; Kenneth Mount | 3:29 |
| 3. | "Chelsea" (Stefy) | Stefy Rae; Jimmy Harry; Greg Kurstin | Jimmy Harry | 2:52 |
| 4. | "Hope Song" (Rock Kills Kid) | Jeff Tucker | Mark Trombino | 3:54 |
| 5. | "Instantly Gratified" (People in Planes) | Peter Roberts; Gareth Jones | Dan Austin | 3:39 |
| 6. | "Better Open the Door" (Motion City Soundtrack) | Justin Pierre; Joshua Cain; Jesse Johnson; Tony Thaxton; Matthew Taylor | Mark Hoppus | 3:02 |
| 7. | "Time After Time" (Quietdrive) | Cyndi Lauper; Rob Hyman | Matt Kirkwold | 3:07 |
| 8. | "Fool for Love" (Stefy) | Stefy Rae; Jimmy Harry | Jimmy Harry | 3:43 |
| 9. | "This Will Be Our Year" (OK Go) | Chris White | Eric Drew Feldman; Rob Laufer; Damian Kulash, Jr. | 2:06 |
| 10. | "I Like What You Say" (Nada Surf) | Matthew Caws; Daniel Lorca; Ira Elliott | Matthew Caws; Tom Beaujour | 2:31 |
| 11. | "Float On" (Ben Lee) | Isaac Brock; Eric Judy; Dann Gallucci | Brad Wood | 4:02 |
| 12. | "Sunset Lover" (Josh Kelley) | Josh Kelley | Josh Kelley | 3:53 |
| 13. | "We Got to Leave" (Caesars) | Joakim Åhlund | Joakim Åhlund | 3:24 |
| 14. | "The Next Big Thing" (Rockett Queen) | Walter Lee; Chris Wild | Ben Shigel | 3:02 |

== Reception ==
=== Box office ===
The film premiered at Grauman's Chinese Theatre, with Betty Thomas and Arielle Kebbel in attendance. In its opening weekend, the film grossed a total of $14.3 million, ranking third in the box office results for that weekend. The film went on to gross $41.9 million in the United States and Canada, and a total of $68.8 million worldwide. The opening weekend 3rd place rank was at the high-end of studio expectations. The film was heavily promoted to female teenagers on Myspace, and the studio believed this campaign was successful, as the opening weekend audience was 75% female and 68% under 25.

=== Critical response ===
On Rotten Tomatoes, the film has an approval rating of 28% based on 93 reviews, with an average rating of 4.5/10. The site's critical consensus reads, "This derivative teen comedy tries to go for cute when it could use more bite." On Metacritic assigned the film a weighted average score of 41 out of 100, based on 27 critics, indicating "mixed or average" reviews. Audiences polled by CinemaScore gave the film an average grade of "B+" on an A+ to F scale.

Angel Cohn of TV Guide gave the film a three stars rating out of four, writing that the 19 to 27 year old age range of the six leads meant that "not one member of this teen picture's cast appears remotely young enough to be in high school", though adding that "veteran director Betty Thomas' light revenge comedy is surprisingly entertaining, if less than original." Cohn concluded, "Teen comedies are notoriously predictable, and screenwriter Jeff Lowell isn't out to rock the genre boat, but his smartly written dialogue and the infectious charm of the cast, particularly Snow and Metcalfe, add up to a winning combination."

Jeannette Catsoulis of The New York Times wrote that the film is "unforgivably clueless about teen culture" and "can't even sustain the courage of its girl-power convictions." Catsoulis was also critical of Metcalfe's "unconvincing" performance, writing that he musters "fewer expressions than a Botox infomercial."

Michael Medved gave John Tucker Must Die two stars out of four, calling it "slick, stupid and slightly sleazy," and that at the half-way mark, the plot collapses. He praised Jenny McCarthy, in a supporting role, saying she "...is notably better than the rest of the cast." Medved concedes that his 17-year-old daughter was more the target demographic and that she liked the film enough to want to watch it again. James Berardinelli of ReelViews also disliked the film. He gave it 1.5 stars out of 4, saying "The gulf is vast between what the studio wants us to think John Tucker Must Die is and what it really is. The marketers and publicists would have us believe this is a dark, edgy teen comedy about a band of two-timed girls taking revenge on the school's biggest hunk. Unfortunately, Betty Thomas' film is neither dark nor edgy (although it occasionally tries masquerading in those categories), nor is it particularly funny." He goes on to mention "The movie may be able to bamboozle a few teen female fans into multiplexes, but it's hard to imagine any of them – even those who swoon at the sight of Jesse Metcalfe – labeling this as better than forgettable. And for anyone outside that demographic unfortunate enough to endure John Tucker Must Die, the memory will be too painful to fade quickly."

Jenny McCarthy's performance in the film earned her a Razzie Award nomination for Worst Supporting Actress.

== Home media ==
The DVD was released on November 14, 2006. A Blu-ray Disc version was released on January 10, 2012. Both releases contain theatrical and extended versions of the film as well as a director's commentary, deleted scenes and featurettes.

== Potential sequel ==
In March 2024, Metcalfe claimed a script had been written for a sequel and it was "circulating" Hollywood, stating he had yet to read it but would like to be in the film. A few days later during a panel at Epic Cons Chicago, Metcalfe, Bush and Kebbel claimed the existence of the script and revealed that it involved all of the original cast.

== See also ==
- The Other Woman
- Ladies vs Ricky Bahl
