= Supermodel (You Better Work) =

1992 single by RuPaul

Single by RuPaul

from the album Supermodel of the World
- A-side: "House of Love"
- Released: November 17, 1992
- Genre: House; dance-pop; disco
- Length: 3:59
- Label: Tommy Boy
- Songwriters: RuPaul; Jimmy Harry; Larry Tee
- Producer: Eric Kupper

RuPaul singles chronology
"I've Got That Feelin'" (1991)	"Supermodel (You Better Work)" (1992)	"Back to My Roots" (1993)

Music video
- "Supermodel (You Better Work)" on YouTube

"Supermodel (You Better Work)" is a song by American dance music singer and drag queen RuPaul. It was released as a double A-sided single alongside "House of Love" on November 17, 1992 by Tommy Boy Records. The song served as the lead single from his debut major label album, Supermodel of the World (1993). The song samples from the "In the Mix" by Mixmasters and "Fashion" by David Bowie. The song became a dance club anthem that, though particularly popular within the gay handbag house scene, found mainstream success. The song consists of RuPaul giving advice to a young black supermodel, and briefly several other models, largely consisting of "sashay, shantay!", "work, turn to the left", "work, now turn to the right", and "you better work". The music video for the song, directed by Randy Barbato and featuring RuPaul in various outfits cavorting around New York, became a staple on MTV. Singer Kurt Cobain of Nirvana cited the song as one of his favorites of 1993, and the two were photographed together at the MTV Video Music Awards that year.

"Supermodel" was a modest hit on the pop charts in both the US (number 45) and the UK (number 39). It also reached number two on the US dance chart. This song is RuPaul's highest charting pop hit in the US to date. The song features spoken words by actress LaWanda Page, who went on to appear in several music videos by RuPaul. The single is most commonly found on compact disc coupled with "House of Love", which would go on to become a single itself in some markets. Various 12-inch vinyl releases were also pressed, including a limited edition picture disc in the United Kingdom. It was also covered by Taylor Dayne for The Lizzie McGuire Movie soundtrack.

In 2024, Rolling Stone ranked "Supermodel (You Better Work)" number one in their list of "The 20 Best Songs by Drag Queens". In 2018 and 2022, Pitchfork featured it in their lists of "50 Songs that Define the Last 50 Years of LGBTQ+ Pride" and "The 250 Best Songs of the 1990s".

== Chart performance ==
In the United States, the song peaked on the Billboard Hot 100 at number 45, on the Cash Box Top 100 at number 50, and the Billboard Hot Dance Club Play chart at number two. It sold nearly 500,000 copies there. It was not only a hit in the US, it also reached number four on the Canadian RPM Dance/Urban chart. In Europe, "Supermodel (You Better Work)" was a top 20 hit in Austria, peaking at number 16. And it entered the top 40 in both the Netherlands (38) and the UK (39), while peaking at number 15 on the Dance Singles chart by Music Week. In Germany, the song charted at number 100.

== Critical reception ==
Alex Henderson from AllMusic noted, "When he tears into 'Supermodel (You Better Work)' and other overtly '70s-influenced dance-floor gems, RuPaul shows himself to be a sweaty, emotional belter who projects a lot more soul and honest emotion than most of the cookie-cutter artists dominating '90s urban-contemporary radio." Larry Flick from Billboard magazine wrote, "New York City club and drag personality returns to the recording world with a festive twirler that aims to lengthen the life of the voguing phenomenon. RuPaul sashays like a seasoned diva over frothy synths and NRG-etic house beats." In February 1993, Billboard reviewed the single alongside Moi Renée's "Miss Honey" and The Ride Committee featuring Roxy's "Get Her" as part of a wave of house tracks built on confrontational vocal performances from the queer club scene. In 2018, Jim Farber from Entertainment Weekly described it as a "pivotal single/lifestyle slogan", adding that it "became an instant club classic, italicized by a plethora of snap-ready tag lines, including "you better work", "I have one thing to say", and "Sashay/Shantay!" each repeated with intensifying attitude." Caroline Sullivan from The Guardian named it "a seventies-style disco workout containing every hysterical cliche of that era, from soaring violins to sonorous groans from Ru. 'See your picture everywhere - a million-dollar derriere', Ru observes in a roar recalling the late, great Divine. Absolutely fabulous." In his weekly UK chart commentary, James Masterton viewed it as "an unremarkable dance/pop tribute to the world of the supermodels sung by the larger than life Rupaul, drag queen extraordinaire."

Pan-European magazine Music & Media commented, "Camp as it is, the musical backing is of course in a stylish '70s disco mode. Give 'Supermodel (You Better Work)' and 'Miss Lady DJ' a try, it's for all sexes." Andy Beevers from Music Week deemed it a "wonderfully OTT tribute to the stars of the catwalk". Mandi James from NME wrote, "Rupaul is a dominatrix drag queen, nearly seven foot in his stilletos, who spends most of the record bitchin', dissin' and coing over the likes of Linda and Cindy. All perfectly innocent fun of course which will alleviate the macho bravado of the dancefloor no ends as the boys sashay along." Sam Wood from Philadelphia Inquirer felt it succeed at "being more than celebrations of surface - the glitz and gloss of haute couture, the perfect coiffure. Fashion is his/her passion, but RuPaul brings an over-the-top sense of commitment to those tracks. Identity, and what constitutes it, are on the line." Rupert Howe from Select remarked its "catwalk cattiness". Mark Frith from Smash Hits gave the song a score of four out of five, adding, "It's a great hi-NRG dance romp which celebrates the world of the supermodel from the most super of all models. Wonderful."

== Music video ==
The accompanying music video for "Supermodel (You Better Work)" was directed by Randy Barbato. The music video premiered in 1993 on MTV and was an unexpected success, as grunge (such as Nirvana) and gangsta rap were popular at the time. It tells the story of a little black girl (played by RuPaul) in the Brewster projects of Detroit, Michigan, who is spotted by an "Ebony Fashion Fair" talent scout who grows up to become a successful model and is given the title Supermodel of the World. The song features LaWanda Page who has several lines in the song, but does not appear in the music video despite appearances in other RuPaul music videos. The music video is a tribute to RuPaul's early childhood and his career in both the gay community and mainstream culture. The phrase "Supermodel You Better Work" was coined by RuPaul in the 90's. It was nominated for "Best Dance Video" at the 1993 MTV Video Music Awards and won an award in the category for "Best Music Video" on the 1993 WMC International Dance Music Awards.

The music video for "Supermodel (You Better Work)" was later made available on Tommy Boy Records' official YouTube channel in 2018, and had generated more than 7.6 million views as of April 2025.

== Media usage ==
It has also been heard in TV shows like iZombie and Pose. The song was also heard in The Brady Bunch Movie in which RuPaul also starred as Mrs Cummings. The was notably covered by Taylor Dayne for the soundtrack of 2003's Hilary Duff's The Lizzie McGuire Movie.

The song was featured in the very first episode of the first season of RuPaul's Drag Race, being performed by contestants Akashia and Victoria Parker in a "lipsync for your life" battle. In 2016, television personality Nene Leakes performed the song on the U.S. version of Lip Sync Battle.

== Impact and legacy ==
In 2017, BuzzFeed ranked "Supermodel (You Better Work)" number 42 in their list of "The 101 Greatest Dance Songs of the '90s" in 2017. Stopera and Galindo stated that this is "the song that brought RuPaul mainstream success." In 2018, Pitchfork featured it in their list of "50 Songs that Define the Last 50 Years of LGBTQ+ Pride". In 2022, Time Out ranked it number 23 in their list of "The 50 Best Gay Songs to Celebrate Pride All Year Long", while Pitchfork ranked it number 222 in their list of "The 250 Best Songs of the 1990s". In 2024, Rolling Stone ranked "Supermodel (You Better Work)" number one in their list of "The 20 Best Songs by Drag Queens", writing, "The glitzy, catchy track is an instructional one to help you locate your inner diva, and it was just as important in making RuPaul the world's most famous drag star." In 2025, Billboard magazine ranked it number 30 in their list of "The 100 Greatest LGBTQ+ Anthems of All Time".

A 2021 single by musician Jimmy Harry under his synthpop outfit Bonsai Mammal with vocals provided by singer Liz used this song. In April 2025, Trixie Mattel and Vincint released a cover of the track, and performed it at Coachella 2025.

Britney Spears' 2013 single "Work Bitch" drew comparisons to "Supermodel (You Better Work)" for its use of RuPaul's "you better work" catchphrase.

== Track listing ==
(varies from country to country; this reflects the United States CD single, which sold the most copies)

1. "Supermodel (You Better Work)" (Ready to Wear Mix)
2. "Supermodel (You Better Work)" (7" Mix)
3. "Supermodel (You Better Work)" (Couture Mix)
4. "Supermodel (You Better Work)" (La Wanda in Your Face)
5. "House of Love" (7" Radio Version)
6. "House of Love" (12" Version)
7. "House of Love" (Dub)

== Charts ==
=== Weekly charts ===
Chart (1992–93)	Peak position
Australia (ARIA)	115
Austria (Ö3 Austria Top 40)	16
Canada Dance/Urban (RPM)	4
Germany (GfK)	100
Netherlands (Dutch Top 40)	26
Netherlands (Single Top 100)	38
UK Singles (Official Charts)	39
UK Airplay (ERA)	58
UK Dance (Music Week)	15
UK Club Chart (Music Week)	10
US Billboard Hot 100	45
US Dance Club Songs (Billboard)	2
US Maxi-Singles Sales (Billboard)	1
US Cash Box Top 100	50

=== Year-end charts ===
Chart (1993)	Position
Canada Dance/Urban (RPM)	36
US (Joel Whitburn's Pop Annual)	171
Netherlands (Dutch Top 40)	207

== 2006 version ==
"SuperModel (You Better Work)" (The RuMixes)

Single by RuPaul featuring Shirley Q. Liquor

from the album ReWorked
- Released: 2006
- Genre: House; dance-pop
- Length: 3:57
- Label: RuCo
- Songwriters: RuPaul; Jimmy Harry; Larry Tee
- Producer: DJ BunJoe

RuPaul singles chronology
"People Are People" (2006)	"SuperModel (You Better Work)" (The RuMixes) (2006)	"Call Me Starrbooty" (2007)

Audio video
- "SuperModel (You Better Work)" on YouTube

In 2006, RuPaul re-recorded the track with an 80's freestyle inspired backing track and released it as the leadoff single from his album ReWorked. This version reached number 21 on the US dance chart.

=== Track listing ===
- US nine track maxi-single
1. "Supermodel (You Better Work)" (El Lay Toya Jam) – 3:55
2. "Supermodel (You Better Work)" (Craig C. Havenhurst Vocal) – 9:29
3. "Supermodel (You Better Work)" (There, U Just Got Rocked Mix) – 4:08
4. "My Love Sees No Color" (Electrolight Popular Mix) – 4:02
5. "Supermodel (You Better Work)" (Clean El Lay Toya Jam) – 3:55
6. "Supermodel (You Better Work)" (Craig C. Encino Edit) – 3:54
7. "My Love Sees No Color" (Electrolight Stockholm Mix) – 4:38
8. "Supermodel (You Better Work)" (Craig C. Neverland Dub) – 9:25
9. "Supermodel (You Better Work)" (Jackopella) – 3:45
- AUS CD No. 1
1. "Supermodel (You Better Work)" (El Lay Toya Jam) – 3:55
2. "Supermodel (You Better Work)" (Craig C. Neverland Instrumental) – 9:27
3. "Coming Out of Hiding" (Trance Gender Mix) – 3:25
4. "My Love Sees No Color" (Electrolight Stockholm Mix) – 4:40
- AUS CD No. 2
1. "Supermodel (You Better Work)" (Craig C. Encino Edit) – 3:55
2. "My Love Sees No Color" (Electrolight Popular Mix) – 4:03
3. "My Love Sees No Color" (Matheos' Dancin' Belly Mix) – 4:25
4. "My Love Sees No Color" (Electrolight Stockholm Edit) – 4:05*
5. "My Love Sees No Color" (Electrolight Popular Extended Club Mix) – 10:21
6. "My Love Sees No Color" (Electrolight Stockholm Extended Club Mix) – 11:04
7. "Supermodel (You Better Work)" (El Lay Toya Acappella) – 3:56
- (Re)Mix is only a dub/edit
