= Sane Advice =

Studio album by LaWanda Page
- Released: 1979
- Genre: Comedy
- Label: Mute

LaWanda Page chronology
Pipe Layin' Dan (1973)	Sane Advice (1979)

Sane Advice is an album by American comedian and actress LaWanda Page. Her fifth and final solo album, it was released by Laff Records in 1979.

This was Page's first and only record without the sort of raunchy, explicit humor found on her previous albums. The album features more of an improvisational and personal view of Page's life than in previous recordings, and it features no second-long monologues. The recording date is unknown.

While Page continued to perform stand-up, continuing her raunchy monologue bits until illness derailed her in the mid-1990s, this was her last album. Her Laff Records contract was terminated following this album's release.

== Track listing ==
1. "Since I Laid My Old Man Down"
2. "Test Tube Babies"
3. "Husband"
4. "Show Biz, Honey!"
5. "Sane Advice"
6. "Beverly Watts"
7. "Pastor's Angels"
8. "Mother's Day"
9. "Bible Cake"
