= Supermodel of the World =

Studio album by RuPaul
- Released: June 8, 1993
- Recorded: 1992–93
- Genre: R&B; pop; dance-pop; hi-NRG; house
- Length: 48:03
- Label: Tommy Boy; Rhino (reissue)
- Producer: Karen Bernod; Eric Kupper; Jimmy Harry; Randy Barbato; Fenton Balley

RuPaul chronology
| RuPaul Is Star Booty (1986) | Supermodel of the World (1993) | Foxy Lady (1996) |

Singles from Supermodel of the World
- 1. "Supermodel (You Better Work)" Released: November 17, 1992; 2. "Back to My Roots" Released: April 27, 1993; 3. "A Shade Shady (Now Prance)" Released: 1993; 4. "House of Love" Released: 1993; 5. "Everybody Dance" Released: 1993

Supermodel of the World is the debut studio album by American singer and drag queen RuPaul, released on June 8, 1993, by Tommy Boy Records. It is his second album overall, his first release being a soundtrack album. With the release of the Supermodel of the World album, RuPaul obtained higher celebrity status, notably due to the album's first single, "Supermodel (You Better Work)". Before the release of this album, he had done some modeling work as a drag queen, hence the album title.

== Background ==
African American actress/comedian LaWanda Page (best known as Aunt Esther on the television series Sanford and Son) is featured in spoken word clips on several album tracks, though she is heard most notably on the track "Supermodel (You Better Work)". That song's chorus also features RuPaul repeating the phrase "Sashay! Shantay!" When asked about the meaning of "shantay", RuPaul replied that the term means "to weave a friend" (from the French "enchanté" which means nice to meet you). The term had previously appeared in the 1990 drag ballroom documentary Paris Is Burning. It also sounds like the French expression "Sachez chanter!", at the imperative form, meaning "Know how to sing!"

The album was reissued on Rhino Records.

== Singles ==
The album's first single, "Supermodel (You Better Work)", was a huge club and dance hit that peaked at number 45 on the Billboard Hot 100 and achieved Gold sales status. It also reached number 39 in the UK Singles Chart. The video for the song was put into heavy rotation on MTV; this was a huge surprise to RuPaul and his record label as, at the time, the music being heavily played on MTV was grunge, gangsta rap, and rock. In addition to the success of "Supermodel (You Better Work)", "Back to My Roots" charted at number one on the Billboard Club/Dance Play Songs Chart on July 24, 1993, and number 40 in the UK Singles Chart, where it was backed with "House of Love" as a double A-side. "A Shade Shady (Now Prance)" also charted at number one on the Billboard Club/Dance Play Songs on October 9, 1993.

== Critical reception ==
Professional ratings
Review scores
| Source | Rating |
|---|---|
| AllMusic | 4.5/5 stars |
| The Philadelphia Inquirer | 3/4 stars |
| Select | 2/5 medals |
| The Village Voice | B+ |

Robert Christgau wrote in his "Consumer Guide" column for The Village Voice: "I know it wouldn't be an authentic disco album without filler, but this self-creation is too blandly male a singer to put over pro forma romance. The exception is 'Supernatural,' as you'll figure out if you match title to persona and consider the possibilities. And when he cops an attitude—on five cuts by my count, culminating in the deep-dish 'A Shade Shady'—he brings off a time-warped genderfuck all his own."

Alex Henderson from AllMusic wrote in retrospect: "A colorful transvestite and icon of African-American gay culture whose outrageous sense of humor never seems to let up, RuPaul could arguably be described as 'The Little Richard of '90s Dance Music.' But RuPaul isn't the novelty act some have dismissed him as being. Boasting a decent vocal range and a strong passion for '70s disco/soul, RuPaul is a bona fide dance/house music artist whose debut album, Supermodel proved him to be a definite asset to '90s house and R&B. When he tears into 'Supermodel (You Better Work)' and other overtly '70s-influenced dance-floor gems, RuPaul shows himself to be a sweaty, emotional belter who projects a lot more soul and honest emotion than most of the cookie-cutter artists dominating '90s urban-contemporary radio. Hopefully, those able to look past his wild image will come to realize how good a singer he is."

== Commercial performance ==
The album peaked at number 109 on the US Billboard 200.

== Track listing ==
| No. | Title | Writer(s) | Length |
|---|---|---|---|
| 1. | "Supermodel (You Better Work)" | RuPaul Charles; Jimmy Harry; Larry Tee | 3:59 |
| 2. | "Miss Lady DJ" | Charles; Eric Kupper | 4:00 |
| 3. | "Free Your Mind" | Charles; Harry | 3:48 |
| 4. | "Supernatural" | Charles; Harry | 4:35 |
| 5. | "House of Love" | Charles; Harry | 3:30 |
| 6. | "Thinkin' 'Bout You" | Charles; Kupper | 3:46 |
| 7. | "Back to My Roots" | Charles; Harry; Kupper | 3:32 |
| 8. | "Prisoner of Love" | Charles; Harry | 4:24 |
| 9. | "Stinky Dinky" | Charles; Harry; Fred Schneider | 4:44 |
| 10. | "All of a Sudden" | Charles; Harry | 3:53 |
| 11. | "Everybody Dance" | Bernard Edwards; Nile Rodgers | 3:56 |
| 12. | "A Shade Shady (Now Prance)" | Charles; Kupper | 3:56 |

== Personnel ==
- RuPaul – vocals
- LaWanda Page – performer
- Fred Schneider – performer
- Jimmy Harry – horn, vocals, producer, engineer
- Uptown Horns – horn
- Tom Coyne – mastering
- Seiji – mixing
- Fenton Bailey – executive producer
- Randy Barbato – executive producer
- Erwin Gorostiza – art direction
- Lan Yin – design
- Mark Contratto – photography
- Mathu – make-up, hair stylist, stylist
- Zaldy – make-up, stylist, hair
- Eric Kupper – backing vocals, producer, engineer, mixing
- Karen Bernod – backing vocals
- Betty Cooper – backing vocals
- Chavonie Cooper Vocals – backing vocals
- Trenise Y. Haddock – backing vocals
- Vincent Haddock Jr. – backing vocals
- Angela M. Hadock – backing vocals
- Kevin E. Ien – backing vocals
- Leon King – backing vocals
- Lisa Lowell – backing vocals
- Mark Mancini – backing vocals
- Sherryl Marshall – backing vocals
- William L. Richardson Jr. – backing vocals
- Carole Sylvan – backing vocals

== Chart positions ==
| Chart (1993) | Peak position |
|---|---|
| US Billboard Top Heatseekers | 1 |
| US Billboard 200 | 109 |

== See also ==
- RuPaul speaks about society and the state of drag as performance art
