= Mausoleum (film) =

1983 American film by Michael Dugan

- Theatrical release poster
- Directed by: Michael Dugan
- Written by: Robert Barich; Robert Madero
- Story by: Katherine Rosenwink
- Produced by: Robert Barich; Robert Madero
- Starring: Bobbie Bresee; Marjoe Gortner; Norman Burton
- Cinematography: Robert Barich
- Edited by: Richard Bock
- Music by: Jaime Mendoza-Nava
- Production company: Western International Pictures
- Distributed by: Motion Picture Marketing
- Release date: February 18, 1983
- Running time: 96 minutes
- Country: United States
- Language: English
- Box office: $1.3 million

Mausoleum is a 1983 American supernatural horror film directed by Michael Dugan and starring Bobbie Bresee, Marjoe Gortner, Norman Burton, and LaWanda Page. The plot follows a young woman who becomes possessed by the same demon that killed her mother.

While not prosecuted for obscenity, the film was seized and confiscated in the UK under Section 3 of the Obscene Publications Act 1959 during the "video nasty" panic. The film was released theatrically in the United States in the spring of 1983, and later won the Special Jury Prize at the 13th Paris Film Festival of Sci-Fi and Fantasy Films in December that year.

== Plot ==
Ten-year-old Susan Walker attends her mother's funeral with her aunt Cora Nomed, who is appointed as her guardian. After the funeral, Susan flees into the family's mausoleum tomb and witnesses a demonic supernatural force that kills a vagrant in the cemetery. The encounter results in Susan falling under the influence of an ancestral demon connected to her family lineage.

Twenty years later, Cora worries about Susan, now thirty and married, on the anniversary of her mother's death. Susan and her husband Oliver Farrell go out for dinner that night, and Susan is attacked by a drunk patron outside. He enters his car, which Susan causes to burst into flames, killing him. Oliver is summoned to New York City for work, leaving Susan home alone. She seduces their landscaper, Ben, before killing him post-coitus with a hand rake. Oliver returns shortly after, and Susan tells him she gave Ben the night off from work.

The next day, Cora arrives at the house to bring Susan paperwork pertaining to the familial inheritance she is due at age 30. In the house, she finds Susan grossly deformed in the figure of a demon. Susan causes Cora to levitate over the staircase before breaking open her chest. That night, Oliver calls Susan's psychologist, Dr. Andrews, alarmed, claiming to have seen Susan in a disfigured state. Susan interrupts the call, appearing entirely normal. The following morning, the Farrells' housekeeper Elsie finds Susan's room glowing green and witnesses her in her deformed state, and flees the house in terror.

At the urging of Oliver, Susan visits Dr. Andrews, who tapes a hypnosis session with her in his office. Initially she reverts to a childlike state before becoming possessed by the demonic entity. Andrews ends the session prematurely, and Susan reverts to her normal self. Disturbed, Andrews consults his colleague, Dr. Logan. The following morning, Susan kills another landscaper sent to her house. That night, Oliver returns home and finds blood splattered on the kitchen telephone. He attempts to confront Susan, but she says she is tired and they will have to talk in the morning.

Meanwhile, Andrews and Logan begin researching demonic possession, convinced that Susan's problem is supernatural and beyond the help of medicine. After analyzing a journal kept by Susan's grandfather, Andrews informs Oliver that the Nomed family is subject to a curse in which firstborn daughters fall prey to a demon. Susan visits a shopping mall alone, and steals a painting from an art gallery. When the gallery owner confronts her, she causes him to levitate over an atrium before he falls multiple stories, and his body is impaled on a sculpture below.

Andrews retrieves a crown of thorns from the Nomed family mausoleum, which, according to Susan's grandfather's journal, will expel the demon. Simultaneously Susan transforms into a fully formed demonic state at home, and brutally kills Oliver. Andrews arrives shortly after and manages to crown Susan, banishing the demon to the mausoleum. Andrews brings Susan to the mausoleum, and she uses the crown of thorns to banish the demon back to its tomb. Susan begins to cry as she now remembers killing her Aunt Cora and husband Oliver. Before they depart, Andrews instructs a gravekeeper to keep the mausoleum sealed from the public. As they drive away, the gravekeeper laughs maniacally. It turns out the gravekeeper is actually Ben, the landscaper from earlier in the film.

== Cast ==
- Bobbie Bresee as Susan Walker Farrell
  - Julie Christy Murray as Young Susan
- Marjoe Gortner as Oliver Farrell
- Norman Burton as Dr. Simon Andrews
- Maurice Sherbanee as Ben
- LaWanda Page as Elsie
- Laura Hippe as Aunt Cora Nomed
- Sheri Mann as Dr. Roni Logan

== Production ==
=== Filming ===
Principal photography of Mausoleum began in February 1981 in Los Angeles. The Promenade Mall in Woodland Hills is featured in the film. According to Michael Franzese, Mausoleum was produced and partially financed by himself and an associate of his in the Cosa Nostra mafia, and began his association with the movie business.

== Release ==
=== Box office ===
The film was given a limited theatrical release in the United States by Motion Picture Marketing (MPM). It first opened in Birmingham AL and Nashville on February 18, 1983. It opened in Los Angeles on April 29, 1983, where it grossed $124,000 during its opening weekend at eighteen theaters. The film went on to have a total domestic gross of $1,342,900.

=== Critical reception ===
Bill O'Connor from the Akron Beacon Journal gave the film a poor review, writing, "What is irritating about this movie is its absolute lack of logic. In order for a horror movie to scare us, we need to understand the parameters of the world we're watching". Variety's film review guide called it an "engaging minor film concerning demonic possession." Howard Reich from the Chicago Tribune described Mausoleum as "one of the weakest horror films one is likely to see". The Miami Herald's Bill Cosford awarded the film a rating of zero out of five stars, deeming it "just bad enough from start to finish to be thoroughly entertaining to the connoisseur of potboilers."

Patrice Smith of the Evansville Courier & Press gave the film a more favorable review, writing that it "reveals such polished technical aspects it may indeed entertain fans of old-fashioned, B-grade cheapies," and adding that its screenplay was logical and faithful to popular occult theory.

The 1998 Blockbuster Entertainment Guide awarded the film one star out of five, deeming it "schlocky and silly." Eleanor Mannikka of AllMovie awarded the film one-and-a-half stars out of five, though ultimately deemed it a "modest but well-wrought occult horror film."

=== Accolades ===
- Won: Special Jury Prize, 13th Paris Film Festival of Sci-Fi and Fantasy Films (December 1983)

=== Home media ===
Mausoleum was released on VHS and LaserDisc by Embassy Home Entertainment. It was later passed in the United Kingdom by the British Board of Film Classification (BBFC) for video release in March 1998.

The film was released on DVD by BCI Entertainment as part of their Exploitation Cinema double feature line, alongside the film Blood Song. Mill Creek Entertainment would later rerelease these two movies together on DVD as well. Both releases are currently out of print. On November 23, 2018, the film was restored and released on DVD and Blu-ray by Vinegar Syndrome, and the limited edition slipcover version sold out in 24 hours. In the UK, a Limited Edition was released on December 18, 2023 by treasured Films. The rating for this release was lowered from its previous 18 certificate to a 15.

== Legal disputes ==
Morton Green, who originally owned the rights to the film's story, sued the film's executive producers, Jerry Zimmerman and Robert Barich, for breach of contract and fraud in April 1981, alleging that they unjustly fired him from directing the film, for which he was promised a salary of $60,000. Green sought his original salary in addition to $1 million in punitive damages. Zimmerman and Barich were subsequently charged with nine felony counts of grand theft and conspiracy for having allegedly purchased luggage and other items from Los Angeles importers, but failing to pay for them.

Following the film's release, financier Michael Zide filed another lawsuit against Western International Pictures, the film's production company, claiming ownership of "all domestic and ancillary rights" to the film. Zide alleged that he had provided a $30,000 loan to the company which was never repaid, and that they forged his signature on a document that cancelled his legal entitlement to 15% of the film's domestic theatrical rentals, in addition to 10% of all advances and guarantees. Getty Film Laboratories, Goldfarb Distributors, and Motion Picture Marketing were named as defendants in the case, in which Zide sought $10 million in damages.

== Sources ==
- Blockbuster Entertainment Guide to Movies and Videos, 1998. New York City, New York: Island Books. 1997. ISBN 978-0-440-22419-8.
- Donahue, Suzanne Mary (1987). American Film Distribution: The Changing Marketplace. Ann Arbor, Michigan: UMI Research Press.
- Elley, Derek, ed. (2000). Variety Portable Movie Guide. New York City, New York: Penguin Books. ISBN 978-0-425-17550-7.
- Speed, F. Maurice; Cameron-Wilson, James (1984). Film Review. London, England: Columbus Books. ISBN 978-0-862-87169-7.
- Young, R. G., ed. (2000). The Encyclopedia of Fantastic Film: Ali Baba to Zombies. New York City, New York: Applause Books. ISBN 978-1-557-83269-6.
