= Adam Ross (musician) =

American guitarist, songwriter, and producer

- Instrument: Guitar
- Years active: 2007–present

Adam Ross is an American guitarist, songwriter, and producer. He is best known for being Rihanna's touring guitarist, including the Good Girl Gone Bad Tour, The Glow In The Dark Tour, and the Last Girl on Earth Tour. He is featured in Rihanna's 2008 release Good Girl Gone Bad Live and has also shared the stage with Jay-Z, Eminem, Chris Brown, and Ne-Yo while on tour. He also went on tour with Adam Lambert on his The Original High Tour from December 31, 2015, to May 6, 2016.

== Background ==
Adam Ross was born in Cincinnati, Ohio and started playing guitar at the age of 13. He studied music at USC and attended the Berklee College of Music on scholarship.

Adam has also toured/recorded with Tricky, Chris Mann (NBC's The Voice), MoZella, Bleu, Stefy, The Pogues, and Sierra Swan.

As a songwriter/music producer/multi-instrumentalist, his TV and film credits include: The Real World, The Kardashians, Cheaper by the Dozen 2, Balls of Fury, The Hills Have Eyes 2, Cheyenne, Bad Girls Club, Kourtney and Kim Take Miami, Styl'd, John Tucker Must Die, and Pimp My Ride.
