= Pipe Layin' Dan =

Studio album by LaWanda Page
- Released: 1973
- Recorded: 1971 or 1972
- Genre: Comedy
- Label: Laff

LaWanda Page chronology
Preach On Sister, Preach On! (1973)	Pipe Layin' Dan (1973)	Sane Advice (1979)

Pipe Layin' Dan is the fourth solo release (and fifth album overall) by American comedian and actress LaWanda Page, billed as simply LaWanda, released on Laff Records in 1973.

The album and other previous recordings were released before Page found mainstream success as Redd Foxx's nemesis Aunt Esther on the situation comedy television show Sanford and Son.

After Page's rise to fame, Laff Records released her recordings, with at least one album, Watch It, Sucka!, reaching gold status. This album includes the comic's blue comedy and her signifying "toasts" to buccaneers and Adolf Hitler.

== Track listing ==
1. "Married Couple"
2. "Little Red Riding Hood"
3. "Daddy's Dick"
4. "Bustin' Cherries"
5. "Three M.F.'s"
6. "Buccaneer"
7. "Pedro and Rosita"
8. "Toast to Hitler"
9. "Old Grandpa"
10. "Don't Wanna Let Go"
11. "One Screw"
12. "It Had to Be You"
13. "Raise the Dead"
14. "TV"
15. "After Supper"
16. "Sister Smith"
17. "Douche Powder"
18. "Chew the Fat"
19. "All the Time"
20. "Home on the Range"
21. "Dying Whore"
22. "Hannah the Whore"
23. "Nite Shift"
24. "Hangin' Tree"
25. "Pipe Layin' Dan"
