= House of Love (RuPaul song) =

Single by RuPaul

from the album Supermodel of the World
- Released: 1993
- Genre: Dance
- Length: 3:31
- Label: Tommy Boy Records
- Songwriter(s): RuPaul; Jimmy Harry

RuPaul singles chronology
"A Shade Shady (Now Prance)" (1993)	"House of Love" (1993)	"Everybody Dance" (1993)

"House of Love" is a song by American drag queen, singer and songwriter RuPaul, released in 1993 by Tommy Boy Records as the singer's third major-label single, and fifth single overall from his debut album, Supermodel of the World (1993). The song did not chart in the US as it was previously released as a Double A-Side to the 1992 single "Supermodel (You Better Work)". It did however reach the Top 40 in the UK.

== Critical reception ==
In his weekly UK chart commentary, James Masterton wrote that "House of Love" is "an unremarkable bit of disco-pop that is unlikely really to progress much further - however sexy he may look on the sleeve." Richard Smith from Melody Maker declared it as a "rather glorious garagey type" thing "that show a fine understanding of the golden age of disco (which, Kim and Tina, doesn't mean ruining the two best songs in Saturday Night Fever)."

Another Melody Maker editor, Chris Roberts, said, "With RuPaul you get a garish pop-up sleeve, very amusing, and a toss disco record in which nothing whatsoever pops anywhere at all." Alan Jones from Music Week named it "RuPaul's finest song", adding further, "a charming, mid-tempo house groove, "House of Love" is currently thriving on the club circuit thanks to mixes by T-Empo and Eric Kupper. It should now steer its way into the Top 40." James Hamilton from the Record Mirror Dance Update described it as a "jiggly pleasant singalong".

== Versions ==
The "Supermodel (You Better Work)" CD single featured three versions of "House of Love".

1. "House of Love" (7" Radio version)
2. "House of Love" (12" version)
3. "House of Love" (Dub)

These tracks were the last three tracks on the CD single.

UK Maxi CD Single

1. "House of Love" (Radio Edit)
2. "House of Love" (T-Empo's Kitsch Bitch Club Mix)
3. "House of Love" (T-Empo's Kitsch Dub)
4. "House of Love" (Eric Kupper 12" Mix)
5. "House of Love" (Diss Dub Mix)

The single was released in various formats, though the most common was a UK CD single. The song itself is typical of early 1990s' house music; the theme of the song expounds on RuPaul's early persona of the "drag queen with a heart of gold". It is an anthem about welcoming all different types of people into your heart.

== Charts ==
Chart (1993–94)	Peak position
UK Singles (OCC)	40
UK Airplay (ERA)	96
UK Dance (Music Week) (1993)	16
UK Dance (Music Week) (1994)	19
UK Club Chart (Music Week) (1993)	9
UK Club Chart (Music Week) (1994)	6
