= Chuck Ellis =

American singer-songwriter

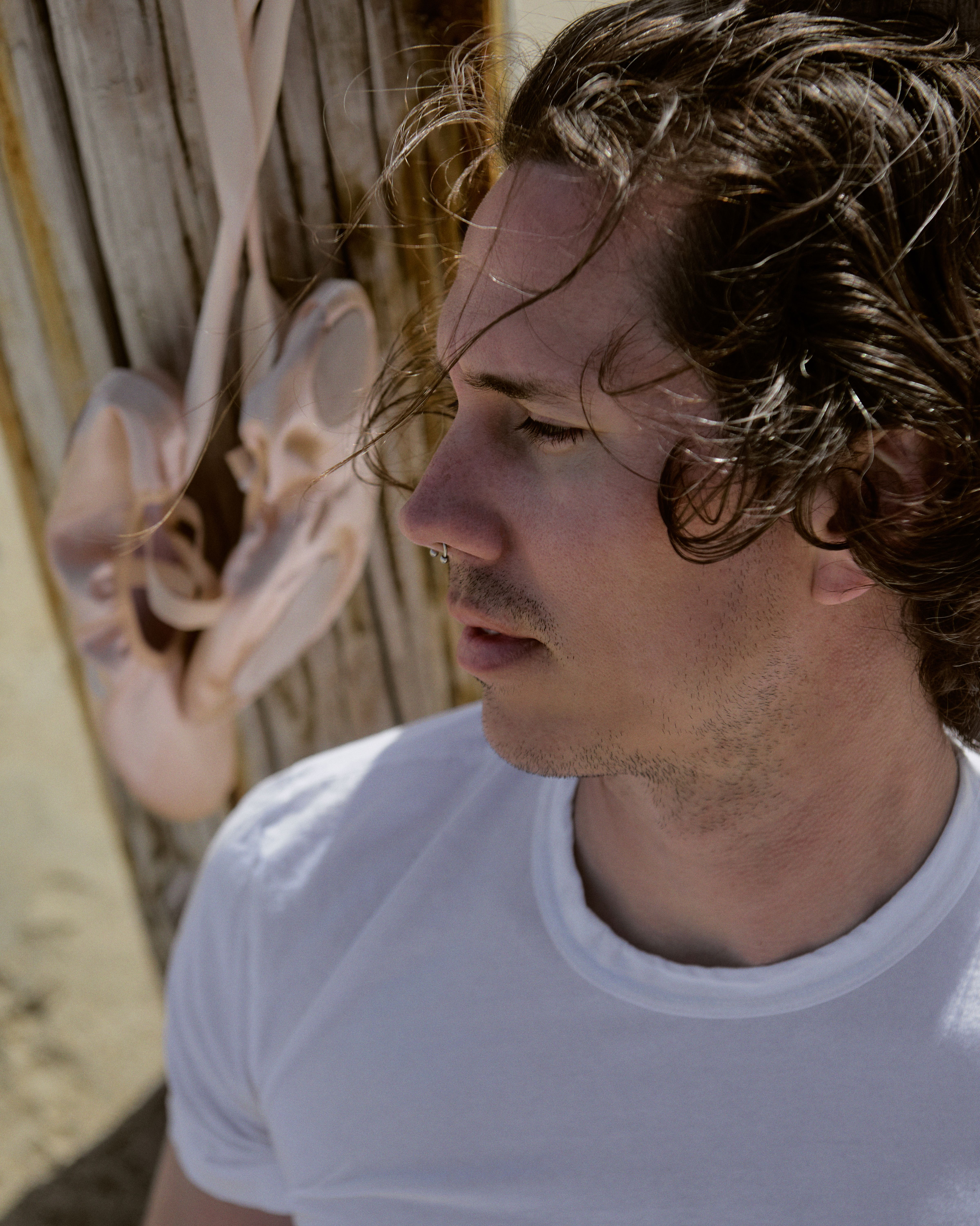
- Chuck Ellis by Larsen Sotelo

Background information
- Born: Jeremy Eli Nicholas; December 15, 1995 (age 30); Charlotte, North Carolina, U.S.
- Genre: Electro R&B, Alt. Country
- Years active: 2009–present
- Labels: Shadow Reserve, Moving Castle
- Website: www.chuckxellis.com

Chuck Ellis is an American songwriter, vocalist and music producer. He signed a publishing deal with Skrillex in 2015 and has since released numerous features, singles and seven studio albums. He has worked alongside Illangelo, Chance The Rapper, SZA, Imad Royal and Ricky Skaggs.

== Early life ==
Chuck Ellis, legally Charles Ellis, was born December 15, 1995, in Charlotte, North Carolina, by the name Jeremy Eli Nicholas to parents Bill Nicholas and his mother, Gwendolyn. He was given the name Current when adopted at age 9 by his stepfather and later released an EP and a full-length album under the name Jeremy Current.

== Career ==
The first self-released EP entitled House on Fire by Jeremy Current was self-produced and initially distributed in October 2009. The album was well received and was described as "travers[ing] an entire range of emotions, from homesickness to the double-edged sword of love lost and found. There’s a world-weariness here that’s coupled with a quiet determination to keep pressing on. Musically, there’s beautiful instrumentation at work, with each piece of the puzzle subtly complementing the next. Current’s voice hovers just above it all, somehow urgent, yet assured, all at once." He recorded his full-length album Dark Land of the Sun at Skaggs Place Studios in Hendersonville, TN in January 2011. The album was co-produced by Current and Luke Skaggs. It features performances by Ricky Skaggs, The Whites, and Chad Lawson. Creative Loafing praised Current for his "solid songwriting and lyrical content and the perfect voice for its delivery."

In 2012, Jeremy Current was awarded the Abe Olman Scholarship for excellence in songwriting by the Songwriters Hall of Fame. Shortly after, he was interviewed by American Songwriter.

Upon moving to LA in March 2014, he began introducing himself as Chuck Ellis and started working with notable artists such as Illangelo, with whom he wrote the song "Alone" which was released on SoundCloud December 25, 2014, and later reproduced by Tchami for his After Life EP. He also contributed vocals to the highly acclaimed Surf (Donnie Trumpet & The Social Experiment album) which was released in summer 2015. In September '15, his first feature release as Chuck Ellis was included on the FIFA 16 soundtrack.

He applied for a legal name change and the request was granted on October 15, 2015, by the Superior Court of California, County of Los Angeles.

In 2017, Ellis started a musical group called Rulers, featuring production from Pomo, Imad Royal, AObeats, Trooko and others. The debut EP Don't Mind was released in November 2017 on Moving Castle and was praised for its "sultry lyrics and gorgeous pop vocals."

Chuck Ellis has released six full-length studio albums. The first, Champagne, released on December 15, 2022 was released on his independent label Shadow Reserve and features much of his own production as well as contributions from The Social Experiment, Imad Royal and lil aaron. The second album was released on March 23, 2024 and was named one of the Best Albums of the Year by Spin Magazine. It features production from Imad Royal, Cubby and Zach Nicita. His third album, "The Weight", was released on October 25, 2024 and was entirely self-produced. His fourth album is called "Nice & Sweet", featuring contributions from Imad Royal and Switch among others.

On September 19, 2025, Chuck Ellis released UP all NIGHT, his 5th studio album. The album features much of his own production. Shortly after, on the 10 year anniversary of his legal name change, he released his 6th album "DSLE". The album heavily features Honduran producer, Trooko, as well as Switch (music producer) and Nate Fox.

== Discography ==
=== Features ===
- "Slow Burn" by Durante (2014)
- "SmthnthtIwnt" ft. Saba by Nico Segal (2015)
- "Can't Say No" by Vindata (2015)
- "Alone" ft. Illangelo by Tchami (2015)

=== Singles ===
- "Wat U Need" (2018)
- "Dangerous Dream" (2019)
- "Get Up and Dance" (2019)
- "Got U" ft. Mija (2019)
- "I Don't Remember" (2021)
- "Silence" (2021)
- "Know What You Like" (2024)
- "Hollow Horses" (2024)
- "Young Money Young Love" (2024)
- "Ballerina" (2024)
- "Darling" (2024)
- "Rendezvous" ft. Ric Wilson (2026)

=== EPs ===
- Covers (Shadow Reserve, 2024)

=== Albums ===
- Champagne (Shadow Reserve, 2022)
- Brainbox (Shadow Reserve, 2024)
- The Weight (Shadow Reserve, 2024)
- Nice & Sweet (Shadow Reserve, 2025)
- UP all NIGHT (Shadow Reserve, 2025)
- DSLE (Shadow Reserve, 2025)
- Lightless Coast (Shadow Reserve, 2026)
