= Liz (American singer) =

Liz Y2K
- Also known as: Liz Y2K
- Born: Elizabeth Nicole Abrams; March 16, 1987 (age 39); Tarzana, Los Angeles, California, U.S.
- Genres: Pop; R&B; electropop; experimental pop; Europop; trance-pop; futurepop; bubblegum pop
- Occupations: Singer; songwriter; actress
- Years active: 2013–present
- Labels: Mad Decent; Jeffree's; Noteworthy; Columbia; Moving Castle
- Website: lizy2k.com

Elizabeth Nicole Abrams, better known as Liz (stylized as LIZ) or Liz Y2K, is an American pop singer and actress from Tarzana, Los Angeles, California.

Liz gained more attention in 2015 when she released a single, made with producer Sophie, called "When I Rule the World" which first appeared in a Samsung commercial.

She is additionally recognized for her late 1990s to early 2000s influence which is prevalent in both her music and fashion. The "Y2K" in her social media handles is in reference to this.

== Early life and career ==
Liz was born in Los Angeles and grew up working in the arts. For 13 years of her childhood, she was a ballerina and danced with The Joffrey Ballet of Chicago for a period of time. In addition to dancing and music, she also has a background in acting and has had several cameos in TV shows, co-starred in feature-length films, and has appeared in commercials throughout her artistic career.

She has stated that she has wanted to be a musician since she was little and began to sing around seven years old. She started working with writers and producers when she was 13 years old after she auditioned for the girl group No Secrets which she did not make.

Throughout her teens and early twenties, Liz performed acoustically at small venues in Los Angeles with her keyboard and would sell CDs at her shows.

== Musical career ==
=== 2013–present ===
Liz is Mad Decent's first pop artist and the first woman signed to the label. Before signing with Mad Decent, Liz was writing for and working with many different DJs and studios in the EDM community. It was through this community that she was introduced to Diplo who later signed her to his label in 2013.

Throughout 2013, Liz released two EPs and a total of eight songs which included collaborating with producers such as The Picard Brothers, Djemba Djemba, Ryan Hemsworth, and Kevin Seaton. She also released the music videos for "Hush" and "U Over Them" during this year. The website Kick Kick Snare named Liz as their favorite solo artist of 2013 and stated that her melodies "bend, twist, and weave around the nostalgic backing tracks in just the right way" and that she was "90's influenced, but forward thinking". In addition to this, Charli XCX asked her to open for her True Romance U.S. Tour alongside KITTEN. It was during this tour that Liz sold her Tour CD.

In 2014, Liz released her seven track EP Just Like You which she made available to download for free through her SoundCloud. She also collaborated with Pharrell Williams for the song "That's My Man," which appeared on The Amazing Spider-Man 2 soundtrack. The music video for this song was released the same year as well as her music video for "All Them Boys."

In 2014, Liz met and collaborated with producer Sophie for the song "When I Rule the World" which was released in 2015. It first appeared in a Samsung commercial and then later appeared in an episode of MTV's Scream. Shortly following the song's release was its music video which gained a lot of attention for its over-the-top glossy and early 2000s aesthetic and hyperpop sound. The song made both The Guardian's and The Idolator's list for "one of the best songs of 2015."

In October 2016, Liz released her mixtape, Cross Your Heart, which she made available to stream through her SoundCloud. It was a 33-minute, one-track file consisting of 16 different songs made with producers such as Henrik the Artist, Lido, Mess Kid, King Henry, and Valentino Khan. To complement the mixtape, Liz teamed up with Nicopanda to create a five-part fashion editorial. During the shoot, Liz had to continuously put glycerine on her face to achieve the "plastic" look seen in the photos. The mixtape received a lot of positive press which included Noisey calling it "one of 2016's most forward-thinking pop releases."

Liz has stated that being influential and being a "tastemaker" is important to her and her musical career. She places high value on being able to progress with music and pop culture and does not follow music trends without fully understanding the source of that music's origin.

On November 15, 2019, Liz released her first full-length studio album Planet Y2K under Moving Castle with the singles "Diamond in the Dark", "BTR 2GTHR", "Lottery", "Laguna Nights", and "Intuition".

On October 20th, 2022 the mobile RPG Arknights revealed their new theme song "We Will Rise” with vocals by Liz.

On September 17th, 2024 Liz played “When I Rule the World” and “Sunscreen” live in Los Angeles for a Sophie tribute night.

In 2025 Liz released singles “Sunscreen" (produced by Sophie) and “Likey" (co-written with Jimmy Harry) followed in 2026 by "L in Lover” and "Juicy Sweet,” all of which are included on her album “Prototype” released June 3rd, 2026.

== Style and influences ==
=== Musical ===
Liz has stated that she felt she made more original sounding music when she went back and studied the artists that influenced her growing up, such as Jimmy Jam and Terry Lewis, Max Martin, NSYNC, Aaliyah, Ashanti, Mýa and Craig David. She says those sounds had a big impact on her and helped her figure out who she was as an artist and as a person. Other artists that influenced her are Britney Spears, Janet Jackson, Gwen Stefani, Kylie Minogue, Madonna, Robyn, Christina Aguilera, and Mariah Carey. Additionally, Liz says that Spears taught her "how to be a pop star".

Japanese culture has been stated to have an effect on her music as well. She likes to explore the idea of innocence in her work, which she feels is present in a lot of Japanese music. Her music can also be tongue-in-cheek at times, and she enjoys taking on a different character for each of her songs.

=== Fashion ===
Liz can often be found wearing big jerseys, pastel colored tracksuits, and vintage pieces that she finds in swap meets. She enjoys clothing that feels nostalgic to her and takes influence from her childhood and the 1990s/early 2000s aesthetic.

She states comfort as a priority in her fashion choices and wears a lot of oversized clothing. She also often mixes tomboy pieces with girly pieces.

Liz believes music and fashion go hand in hand and she is inspired by designers and creative directors with how they "help create iconic moments in pop culture."

== Tours ==
- Mad Decent Block Party (2014)

=== Supporting ===
- Charli XCX True Romance U.S. Headlining Tour (2013)

== Discography ==
Liz discography
- Studio albums: 1
- EPs: 3
- Live albums: 1
- Singles: 29
- Mixtapes: 1
- Demo albums: 1

=== Albums ===
==== Studio albums ====
Title	Details
Planet Y2K	Released: November 15, 2019; Label: Moving Castle; Formats: CD, Digital download, streaming
Prototype	Released: June 12, 2026; Label: Noteworthy Productions LLC; Formats: CD, Digital download, streaming

==== Mixtapes ====
Title	Details
Cross Your Heart	Release: October 17, 2016; Label: Nicopanda; Format: Streaming

==== Demo albums ====
Title	Details
Liz: Tour CD	Released: 2013; Label: Mad Decent; Format: CD

=== EPs ===
Title	Details
XTC	Release: March 5, 2013; Label: Jeffree's; Format: CD, streaming
Hush	Release: June 18, 2013; Label: Mad Decent, Jeffree's; Format: Digital download, streaming
Just Like You	Release: February 27, 2014; Label: Mad Decent; Format: Streaming
Just Like You (Time Capsule Edition)	Release: June 10, 2024; Label: Mad Decent; Format: Vinyl, CD, digital download, streaming

=== Singles ===
==== As lead artist ====
Title	Year	Album
"XTC"	2013	Liz: Tour CD and XTC
"Underdogs" (featuring Riff Raff)	2013	Liz: Tour CD and XTC
"Horoscope"	2013	Liz: Tour CD
"Every Memory"	2013	Liz: Tour CD and Hush
"Hush"	2013	Liz: Tour CD and Hush
"U Over Them"	2013	Liz: Tour CD
"Day n' Nite" (with Ryan Hemsworth)	2013	Liz: Tour CD
"Stop Me Cold"	2013	Liz: Tour CD and Just Like You
"All Them Boys"	2014	Just Like You
"Y2K"	2014	Just Like You
"Say U Would"	2014	Just Like You
"Do I Like U"	2014	Just Like You
"Don't Say" (featuring Tyga)	2014	Just Like You
"Turn Around"	2014	Just Like You
"That's My Man"	2014	Non-album single from The Amazing Spider-Man 2
"When I Rule the World"	2015	Cross Your Heart
"Tropical Holiday"	2017	Non-album singles
"Queen of Me"	2018	Non-album singles
"Could U Love Me"	2018	Non-album singles
"Super Duper Nova"	2018	Non-album singles
"Pandemonium"	2018	Non-album singles
"Last Call"	2018	Planet Y2K
"Diamond in the Dark" (featuring Slayyyter)	2019	Planet Y2K
"BTR 2GTHR"	2019	Planet Y2K
"Lottery" (featuring Aja)	2019	Planet Y2K
"Laguna Nights"	2019	Planet Y2K
"Intuition"	2019	Planet Y2K
"Cloudbusting"	2020	Planet Y2K
"We Will Rise"	2022	Arknights
“Sunscreen” (with SOPHIE)	2025	Prototype
"Likey"	2025	Prototype
"L in Lover"	2026	Prototype
"Juicy Sweet"	2026	Prototype

==== As featured artist ====
Title	Year	Album
"Set Me Free" (Diplo featuring Liz)	2015	Non-album single
"Wild Target" (Henrik the Artist featuring Liz)	2016	Non-album single
"Do It Again" (FEMM featuring Liz)	2017	Tokyo Ex Machina
"No Apologies" (Rytmeklubben featuring Liz and Santell)	2018	Non-album single
"No Apologies" (Synchronice featuring Liz)	2018	Synchronice
"Real Life" (Remix) (Sizzy Rocket featuring Liz)	2018	Non-album single
"Sweat" (Sonikku featuring Liz)	2021	Joyful Death
"Supermodel" (Bonsai Mammal featuring Liz)	2021	Non-album single

=== Guest appearances ===
Year	Title	Artist(s)
2012	"Poison"	Audrey Napoleon
2012	"Human"	Nicky Romero · Zedd
2012	"Hourglass"	Zedd
2012	"Learn to Fly" [as Betty Trouble]	XV
2012	"Opium" [as Betty Trouble]	Rusko
2014	"CAND¥¥¥LAND"	tofubeats
2014	"My Rulez"	Kitten
2014	"Live Forever"	Travis Barker
2014	"Employee of the Month"	2 Chainz
2014	"Would U Believe It"	Usher
2015	"Brand New"	Myrne
2015	"Set Me Free"	Diplo
2015	"Wild Target"	Henrik the Artist
2016	"Luxury"	Lil' Fang & Yup'in
2017	"Do It Again"	FEMM
2018	"No Apologies"	Rytmeklubben
2018	"Real Life (Remix)"	Sizzy Rocket
2018	"Reconcile"	Gent & Jawns
2018	"Missing"	Synchronice
2019	"Go Time"	AObeats
2020	"Sweat"	SONIKKU
2020	"WKND"	SONIKKU
2020	"Spells On U"	That Kid
2021	"Supermodel (You Better Work)"	Bonsai Mammal
2024	"Live In My Truth"	SOPHIE & BC KINGDOM
2024	"Why Lies"	SOPHIE & BC KINGDOM

=== Music videos ===
Year	Title	Director
2013	"Hush"	Mike Bishop
2013	"U Over Them"	Niko Javan
2014	"All Them Boys"	Mike Harris
2014	"That's My Man" (lyric video)	
2014	"My Rulez" (with Kitten)	Kaitlin Christy
2015	"When I Rule the World"	Justin Francis
2017	"Do It Again" (with FEMM)	
2018	"No Apologies" (with Rytmeklubben)	Chris Helberg
2018	"Reconcile" (with Gent & Jawns)	
2018	"Super Duper Nova"	James Orlando
2018	"Pandemonium"	James Orlando
2019	"Last Call" (Afterparty Mix)	James Orlando
2019	"Diamond in the Dark" (feat. Slayyyter)	Axel Bizzari

== Awards and nominations ==
Year	Association	Category	Nominated work	Result	Ref
2021	AIM Independent Music Awards	Best Independent Remix	"Sweat" (with Sonikku) (Sophie Remix)	Nominated	
