= The Orange Album =

Studio album by Stefy
- Released: August 29, 2006
- Recorded: 2004–06
- Genre: Pop; new wave; electronic; rock
- Length: 44:09
- Label: Wind-up
- Producer: Jimmy Harry; Glitch

Singles from The Orange Album
- 1. "Chelsea" Released: July 18, 2006; 2. "Hey School Boy" Released: November 6, 2006

The Orange Album is the debut (and to date, only) album by American band Stefy. It was released on August 29, 2006, in the United States and on April 23, 2007, in the United Kingdom by Wind-up. Compared to the works of Gwen Stefani and Blondie, the album took influence from pop, new wave, electronic, and rock music. Stefy collaborated with producers Jimmy Harry and Glitch for the album, as well as Greg Kurstin and Mimi Jacobson for lyrics. According to the lead singer, Stefy Rae, The Orange Album took over three years to complete.

The Orange Album received mixed reviews from music critics, with many applauding the "danceable qualities" of the album, but criticizing the "weak" songs. Commercially, the album was unsuccessful, peaking at number 142 and selling 5,200 copies in the UK, however, the album had some success in New Zealand, being named "CD of the Week" in early 2007 by the music television show C4 Select Live.

== Promotion ==
=== Singles ===
Stefy released two singles from the album, and a total of five music videos. Lead single "Chelsea" was commercially successful, managing to peak in the lower positions of several charts, including in the UK and in Ireland. The single also peaked at number fifteen on the Billboard Dance Club Songs chart, and number eighteen on the Dance/Mix Show Airplay component chart. A music video for the single was produced, and featured actor Adam West as a judge in a fictitious court setting.

The album's second and final single, "Hey School Boy", was released on November 6, 2006, and was commercially unsuccessful. A music video directed by Nigel Dick was created, and uploaded on Stefy's Vevo account. Promotional single "Orange County" was also released in 2006, and was considered a standout track from The Orange Album. The last three videos were made by Stefy herself, and were only sold as promo singles. The videos were made for the songs "Orange County", "Pretty Little Nightmare" and "Lucky Girl", while the latter is a song originally written and recorded by Los Angeles-based artist Jonneine Zapata.

== Critical response ==
Professional ratings
Review scores
Source	Rating
Billboard	favorable
CMJ New Music Monthly	(Unfavorable)
Daily Express	(Favorable)
IGN	(Favorable)

The Orange Album received mixed reviews from music critics. In a highly favorable review, Marcus Dunk of Daily Express applauded the album, calling it "a delirious run of pop tracks – all with strong eighties' vibes and relentless hooks." Chris Carle, writing for IGN, declared the album "amazing", stating "[Rae's] vocals are right out front" and "the entire record is solid"; Carle further praised the tracks "Chelsea", "Hey School Boy", and "Lucky Girl". A critic from Billboard also enjoyed the effort for being "refreshing, adventurous, [and] even daring," adding that "Stefy is one to watch".

Scott Hefflon of Lollipop Magazine panned the album, calling it "thin, deliberate, new wave pop diva crap that banks off the fact that people wanna hear a tribute band", unfavorably comparing it to the works of Blondie, No Doubt, and Missing Persons. A critic from CMJ New Music Monthly was disappointed with The Orange Album, labelling it as "pale imitations of classic decade-of-decadence acts", concluding that Stefy is "trying too hard to be cool".

== Chart performance ==
Commercially, The Orange Album did not perform well. The album failed to chart on the Billboard 200, but fared well on the US Dance/Electronic Albums chart, debuting and peaking at number twelve for the week ending September 9, 2006; however, it dropped off the chart one week later. In the United Kingdom, the album also underperformed, debuting and peaking at position 142 in early 2007.

== Track listing ==
All tracks produced by Jimmy Harry except "You and Me Against the World", which is produced by Harry and Glitch.

No.	Title	Writer(s)	Length
1.	"Chelsea"	Jimmy Harry; Greg Kurstin; Stefy Rae	2:52
2.	"Hey School Boy"	Harry; Mimi Jakobson; Rae	3:29
3.	"Love You to Death"	Harry; Jakobson; Rae	3:12
4.	"Orange County"	Harry; Glitch; Jakobson; Rae	4:25
5.	"Where Are the Boys"	Harry; Rae	4:31
6.	"Cover Up"	Kurstin; Guy Chambers; Jakobson; Rae	3:43
7.	"Orange Crush"	Harry; Glitch; Rae	2:52
8.	"Lucky Girl"	Jonneine Zapata; Ty Stevens	4:07
9.	"You and Me Against the World"	Harry; Jakobson; Rae	4:18
10.	"Pretty Little Nightmare"	Harry; George; Rae	3:13
11.	"Nothing Really"	Harry; Michael McGroarty; Nick Huntington; Rae	3:45
Total length:			44:09

== Charts ==
Chart (2006)	Peak position
US Top Dance Albums (Billboard)	12

== Release history ==
Location	Date	Format(s)	Label(s)	Ref.
United States	August 29, 2006	CD; digital download	Wind-up	
United Kingdom	April 23, 2007	CD; digital download	Wind-up	
