= Adam of Ross =

13th-century Irish Cistercian monk and translator

Adam of Ross (fl. 1279) was an Irish Cistercian monk.

An Anglo-Irish native of New Ross, County Wexford, Adam is believed to have been a member of the Cistercian monastery at Dunbrody, County Wexford. He was the author of a translation into French of the Vision of St. Paul. He was a severe moralist, encouraging the use of French in Ireland for religious purposes. Adam wrote his translations for the benefit of his brothers in religion, specifically on how to avoid going to Hell.
