= Groundislava =

- Birth name: Jasper Patterson
- Born: Los Angeles, California
- Genres: Electronic, hip hop, Chiptune
- Occupation(s): Producer, musician
- Years active: 2009-present
- Labels: Friends of Friends, Tall Corn Music, Wedidit
- Website: groundislava.com

Jasper Patterson, better known by his stage name Groundislava, is an electronic musician and music producer based in Los Angeles, California. He is one of the founding members of the LA-based music collective Wedidit.

== Career ==
Patterson, whose father Michael Patterson, directed the 1980s A-Ha video, Take On Me, grew up in Palms, Los Angeles. He attended Hamilton High School there and briefly studied animation before turning to music. His first major release, Groundislava, was released in 2011 on the Friends of Friends record label. His sophomore album, Feel Me was released on the Friends of Friends label in 2012. He released Frozen Throne, his third major album on the Friends of Friends label in 2014. In 2014, he released an interactive video, directed by The Great Nordic Sword Fights, for the single "Girl Behind The Glass" from Frozen Throne as a playable computer application.

== Discography ==
=== Studio albums ===
- Groundislava (2011)
- Feel Me (2012)
- Frozen Throne (2014)
- Endless Voyage (2017)
- Groundislava 2 (2018)
- Worldware (2023)

=== Compilation albums ===
- Kutmah Presents Worldwide Family, Vol. 2 (2012)
- Groundislava Treasure Chest (2013)
- 5oFoF: Five Years of Friends of Friends (2014)

=== EPs ===
- Book of Tech EP (2011)
- TV Dream EP (2012)
- GIL’s SAGA I: Hidden Wellspring (2020)
- GIL’s SAGA II: Candlelight Igloo (2021)

=== Singles ===
- "TV Dream" (2012)
- "Feel The Heat" (2014)
- "Girl Behind The Glass" feat. Rare Times (2014)
- "Flatline" feat. Erik Hassle (2015)

=== Official remixes ===
- Slugabed - "Sex - Groundislava Remix" (2012)
- Chvrches - "Gun (Groundislava Remix)" (2013)
- RÜFÜS DU SOL - "Desert Night (Groundislava Remix)" (2014)
- Kitty - "Last Minute (Groundislava Remix)" (2015)
