= Blue Film (album) =

Studio album by Lo-Fang
- Released: February 24, 2014
- Recorded: London; Nashville; Capitol Studios, Los Angeles
- Genre: Indie pop
- Length: 42:12
- Label: 4AD
- Producer: Francois Tetaz

Singles from Blue Film
- 1. "#88" Released: October 7, 2013

Blue Film is the debut album by the American singer-songwriter Lo-Fang. Released in 2014 by 4AD, it began as a mix tape that was turned into a full-length album with additional material.

== Background ==
In 2011, Lo-Fang's friend Steve Adams, a director of photography for National Geographic Channel, gave him a free ticket and invited him along on a work trip to Cambodia where Lo-Fang wrote the song "#88". From There, he had traveled to Tokyo, Bali, London, and across America. Lo-Fang, real name Matthew Hemerlein, reveals that a lot of those places and the people he has met has not only influenced his lyrics, but the instruments as well. Lo-Fang can play the violin, cello, bass, guitar, and piano. All of these instruments were incorporated into the album.

It took three years for Lo-Fang to complete the mixtape-turned-album. After dropping out of college, Hemerlein focused on his music and small performances. Although he did not catch the attention of any record studios at first, his lyrics landed him a publishing deal. Later on, in 2013, Lo-Fang was signed to British record label 4AD.

Blue Film gives an insight look into negative relationships and although slightly personal for him, Lo-Fang is able to keep it general enough for his fans and other listeners to be able to relate to it.

== Style ==
I think a lot of my views of Cambodia came through in some of the songs that are a little bit more soulful. Something like Permutations or Look Away or #88 ... I think they have a connection to Cambodia. Even the melody does a bit. I think you hear a bit of that in the melody of the #88, for sure. But initially all the lyrics were written in Angkor Wat or in Siem Reap in Cambodia.

— Lo-Fang, Curious Animal

Lo-Fang reveals that the meaning of the title is a mix between sadness and coolness. He believes that his music has a cinematic quality to it and the title Blue Film embodies that. He also throws in that there is a bit of play on words when mentioning an adult film, Blue Movie by Andy Warhol.

Although classified as indie pop, Blue Film possesses elements of R&B, classical, synthesizers, and electro pop. As a musician talented in playing many instruments and an appreciation for all types of styles, Lo-Fang added as many elements as he could during recording and post-production in order to showcase what he was capable of.

Blue Film is a very intimate album, but very raunchy as well. In many of his songs, the music is very smooth sounding, but with his ominous and soft voice, combined with the lyrics itself, it is very misleading as to what he is talking about. This record could indisputably be considered one to be all about sex but in a very abstract sense.

Every song on the album has a different feel to it—From more mainstream sounds coming from "Animal Urges" and "Look Away", luyring and menacing tones in "Confusing Happiness", and chilling and subdued covers of female duo BOY's "Boris" and "You're the One That I Want" from the musical Grease (musical).

== Critical reception ==
Professional ratings
Aggregate scores
Source	Rating
Metacritic	64/100
Review scores
Source	Rating
AllMusic	4/5 stars
NME	6/10 stars
Pitchfork Media	5.1/10
PopMatters	7/10 stars

- All Music says, "As dark as the album gets, Hemerlein manages to preserve the humanity of his songs -- there's a warmth to his voice and a brightness to his music that makes the disturbing places he explores a little more relatable."
- Blue Film is an appealing blast of lo-key songs about you-know-what in the most debase way possible, and if there's anything close to offering sonic pornography for the ears, well, this might just be the thing to hear", says music critic Zachary Houle from Pop Matters.
- A review on Pitchfork (website) comments that, "Lyrically, Lo-Fang songs range from almost embarrassingly inert to annoyingly overwrought to frustratingly tone deaf. The themes they cover are intro creative writing class material: confronting the tension between having a sex drive and being a thoughtful person, searching for meaning in jealousy about an ex, being inspired by stuff in life."
- "Ranging from broad styles such as classical to modern-day electronica, Lo-Fang effortlessly ping-pongs between diverse styles, and offers everything vocally from a soulful R&B croon to a Bon Iver-worthy falsetto."

== Commercial performance ==
Lo-Fang got his big break when he was asked to be the opening act on a singer from New Zealand, Lorde’s tour in 2013. His single "#88" was one of her favorite songs and once they met up in a L.A. studio, they immediately kicked it off and thus began the start to his name getting out more in the music industry.

Lo-Fang's cover of "You're the One That I Want" was created for the Chanel No. 5 commercial with supermodel Gisele Bündchen.

== Track listing ==
No.	Title	Length
1.	"Look Away"	5:00
2.	"Boris" (Mr thela cover)	3:38
3.	"When We're Fire"	3:48
4.	"Light Year"	3:59
5.	"Blue Film"	3:04
6.	"Interlude"	0:30
7.	"#88"	6:48
8.	"Intro"	0:25
9.	"Animal Urges"	5:01
10.	"Confusing Happiness"	3:04
11.	"You're the One That I Want" (cover)	3:24
12.	"Permutations"	3:31

== Charts ==
Chart (2014)	Peak position
Belgian Albums (Ultratop Flanders)	125
US Top Heatseekers Albums (Billboard)	17
