= Moving Castle (record label) =

American record label

- Founded: December 2013
- Founder: AO Beats, Hunt for the Breeze, Manila Killa &; Robokid
- Genre: Pop, Electronic
- Country of origin: United States
- Location: Los Angeles
- Official website: www.movingcastle.com

Moving Castle is a Los Angeles-based record label and music-making collective founded in Washington, D.C., by producers AO Beats, Hunt for the Breeze, Manila Killa & Robokid in December 2013.

== History ==
Hunt for the Breeze a.k.a. Faisal Matin had previously started learning how to produce using FruityLoops. He founded Moving Castle in December 2013, along with fellow producers AO Beats, Manila Killa & Robokid. Within its first months the collective had released its first compilation via SoundCloud where, as of October 2015, some of its songs had accumulated over 200,000 listens.

In early 2015, several artists within the collective were gaining media coverage on music blogs such as Complex, THUMP by Vice magazine and the Nest HQ imprint of Skrillex's Owsla label. Skrillex found personal interest in Moving Castle and in partnership with Nest HQ, Moving Castle showcased at South by Southwest in March 2015. The showcase featured a guest appearance from Porter Robinson. Moving Castle has released three subsequent compilations titled Moving Castle Vol. 002, 003 & 004 respectively.

Mixmag published a feature-length interview with several current members of the label in 2017.

Moving Castle artist Qrion was featured in the Billboard Dance Emerging Artists: August 2019 list.

== Artists ==
- Alizzz
- AO Beats
- Ba-Kuura
- Bamf
- Blaise Railey
- Catt Moop
- Chet Porter
- Dash30
- Dirty Chocolate
- Dugong Jr.
- Hunt for the Breeze
- Jailo
- Jai Wolf
- Juuku
- Kappa Kavi
- Khamsin
- LIZ
- Manila Killa
- Mark Johns
- Qrion
- Robokid
- Rulers
- Satica
- Shaylen
- Simon Cress
- Treehaus
- Vices
- WRLD
- Yung Wall Street
