= Lo-Fang =

American musician

- Born: Matthew Jordan Hemerlein; 20 October 1983 (age 42)
- Origin: Columbia, Maryland, United States
- Genres: Indie pop, alternative rock, classical
- Occupations: Multi-instrumentalist, singer-songwriter
- Instruments: Vocals, guitar, cello, bass, violin, piano, mandolin
- Label: 4AD
- Website: lo-fang.com

Matthew Jordan Hemerlein (born 20 October 1983), better known by the stage name Lo-Fang, is a singer-songwriter and classically-trained musician. His debut album Blue Film was released on 25 February 2014, by 4AD.

== Early life and education ==
Lo-Fang was born Matthew Jordan Hemerlein on 20 October 1983. Hemerlein is the middle child of three. He and his siblings were home schooled by their mother until age 13 at their farmhouse in Columbia, Maryland, surrounded by a menagerie of chickens, dogs, cats and eight bee apiaries. His father was employed in the family's steel manufacturing business.

Hemerlein began playing the violin at five years old. His father plays the piano and his older brother and younger sister are both musically inclined.

Hemerlein drove forklifts during summers until he was knocked unconscious by a chain binder while working on the loading docks. He attended Wilde Lake High School and graduated in 2002.

He attended Loyola University New Orleans, but after contracting Lyme disease, returned to his home in Maryland, where he started teaching guitar and piano to children in Baltimore. He is classically trained and can play a number of instruments, including piano, cello, guitar, violin, and string bass.

During the latter years of the 2000s, Hemerlein began teaching music to children and performing in galleries and museums. He had been with his sister Mallory to perform as part of the Family Hemerlein, a variety show featuring musicians and comedians.

== Career ==
Hemerlein's stage name, Lo-Fang, came to him while he was driving through Sedona, Arizona on his way to Los Angeles. He chose it mainly because of the symmetry of the letters and his attempt to balance the feminine and masculine elements in his music. As he sees it: " 'Lo' relates 'soft and soothing' and the strings and kind of the way I sing, and the 'Fang' element is more like the harsh, electronic sounds and the bass."

In 2010, he self-released an album under his birth name that was recorded in a month with the help of a grant from DC Commission on Arts and Humanities called Hot Nickels, and in spring of 2011 opened for British folk duo Smoke Fairies in London. A friend put Hemerlein in touch with a European booking agent who praised Hemerlein's music to promoters in Belgium and Germany. He was booked for a number of appearances, including solo performance in Berlin and opening for James Vincent McMorrow in Cologne. He was subsequently offered a publishing contract by EMI. He then received offers to collaborate on sessions in London and Nashville.

Lo-Fang signed with 4AD in late September 2013. He wrote Blue Film as he traveled around the world to Cambodia, Bali, London, Tokyo, and elsewhere. While developing Blue Film from a mixtape to a full-fledged album, Lo-Fang collaborated with Grammy-winning producer François Tétaz. The album was released on 24 February 2014 in the UK and a day later in the US, by 4AD. It includes both "#88" and "Boris" from his earlier twelve-inch single, along with 10 other tracks influenced by a variety of genres, including electronica, R&B, classical, folk music, and pop music.

He was the opening act for Lorde in the Spring of 2014, who picked his song "#88" as her second favorite from 2013. He also made a cameo appearance as a singer in the ABC drama Revenge.

In the autumn of 2014, Lo-Fang was selected by Baz Luhrmann as the singer in his latest "mini film" advertisement for Chanel No. 5. Throughout the film, he sings his slower, romantic, cover rendition of "You're the One that I Want", the classic from the 1978 film Grease, which was co-produced with Australian sound engineer François Tétaz. He released a mixtape entitled Every Night, which became available both to stream and purchase on 20 October 2014. Lo-Fang also toured with Rhye and performed a handful of solo shows in the US and Mexico during the autumn.

His song "You’re The One That I Want" was used in the Netflix original French film I Am Not an Easy Man in April 2018. In summer of 2018, he released a single, "The Whole Summer".

== Discography ==
=== Studio albums ===
List of studio albums, with selected chart positions
Title	Album details	Peak chart positions		
Title	Album details	US Heat	BEL (FL)	UK Indie Brk.
Blue Film	Released: 24 February 2014; Label: 4AD; Format: CD, LP, digital download	17	125	6

=== Mixtapes ===
List of mixtapes, with selected information
Title	Mixtape details
Every Night	Released: 2014; Label: 4AD; Format: Digital download

=== Other albums ===
List of albums, with selected information
Title	Mixtape details
Near Other Worlds (Feat. The Seattle Harmonic Voices)	Released: 2020; Label: Ocean Cloud Records; Format: Digital download
Near Other Worlds: Vol. II (Feat. Samundra)	Released: 2020; Label: Ocean Cloud Records; Format: Digital download

=== Singles ===
List of singles
Title	Year	Album
"#88"	2013	Blue Film
"The Whole Summer"	2018	Power Magi¿

=== Promotional singles ===
Title	Year	Album
"When We're Fire"	2014	Blue Film

=== Other charted songs ===
Song	Year	Peak chart positions							Album
Song	Year	BEL (FL)	BEL (WA)	FRA	SPA	SWI	UK	UK Indie	Album
"You're the One That I Want"	2014	83	43	38	36	67	194	12	Blue Film
