= Stefy =

- Origin: Orange County, California, U.S.
- Genres: Pop rock, synthpop, electronic
- Years active: 2002–2009
- Labels: Wind-up Records (2004-2008)
- Members: Jason Gaviati; Stefy Rae; Sean Meyer; Jordan Plosky
- Past members: Adam Ross; Andreas Brobjer

Stefy (styled as STEFY) was an American electro-nu music pop band from Orange County, California, United States. The group, initially known as "The Lovely", consisted of Jason Gaviati (keyboard), Stefy Rae (vocals), Sean Meyer (guitar) and Jordan Plosky (drums). Their debut album, The Orange Album, was released by Wind-up Records in the United States on August 28, 2006 and in the United Kingdom on April 23, 2007. The group received substantial praise having gained a cult following due to The Orange Album, with many comparing their style to that of Gwen Stefani, No Doubt, and Debby Harry. Stefy Rae's feisty stage presence also drew numerous comparisons to Stefani, in one article described as having "plenty of seductive sass", as well as having "the brashness of Pink". Rae herself is of Bolivian heritage thanks to her grandmother who inspired her to sing.

The group's song "Chelsea" gained much popularity after appearing in the soundtrack to the official video game for the FIFA World Cup 2006. Despite the name suggesting the song may have been written about a specific individual, Rae assured fans that it was written about a specific type of girl, and not anyone in particular. The group also appeared live on CD:USA to perform "Orange County". In 2007, the group toured the UK as a support act for The Pipettes and in April they played a headlining show in London. Stefy gained further popularity having been included in the soundtrack to the 2006 movie John Tucker Must Die, which included two songs: "Chelsea", and also "Fool For Love" (which was written specifically for the film).

Although they had established a devoted cult following, the group had not yet broke into mainstream popularity across the United States. However, they did have some success in the UK and charted at number 15 on the Billboard Hot Dance Club Play chart. "Chelsea" gained a cult following within the UK that "embraced them with open arms" and gained further recognition in Australia after receiving frequent radio play.

In 2008, the group was dropped from their label, Wind-Up Records, with their website having its final update in mid-2007.

In May 2009, after over two years of no updates, Stefy released four new demos on their MySpace page, including Back Tonight. In September, it was revealed by Stefy herself that a second album was not going to happen unless she was signed with another label. The same year, Stefy released a new song, Tear Me Up, independently, appearing in the soundtrack for the film Sorority Row.

== Discography ==
=== Albums ===
Logo

- The Orange Album (August 29, 2006)

=== Singles ===
Year	Single	U.S. Hot Dance Club Play	UK Singles Chart	Irish Singles Chart	Album
2006	"Chelsea"	15	82	96	The Orange Album
2006	"Fool for Love"	-	-	-	John Tucker Must Die Soundtrack
2006	"Hey School Boy"	-	-	-	The Orange Album
2006	"Orange County"	-	-	-	The Orange Album

In addition to the two singles released, three music videos were made by Stefy herself for the songs "Orange County", "Pretty Little Nightmare" and "Lucky Girl". These videos were to promote the album after Wind-Up Records stopped promotion. They were not released as singles.
