= LaWanda Page =

American actress and comedian (1920–2002)

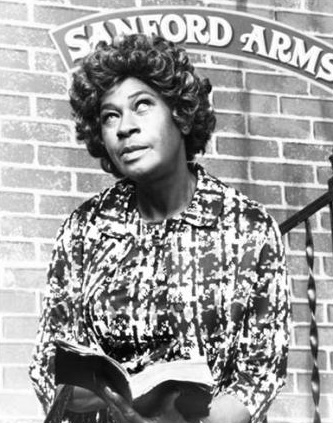
- Page as Aunt Esther in Sanford Arms, 1977
- Born: Alberta Richmond; October 19, 1920; Cleveland, Ohio, U.S.
- Died: September 14, 2002 (aged 81); Los Angeles, California, U.S.
- Resting place: Inglewood Park Cemetery
- Notable work: Esther (Aunt Esther) Anderson – Sanford and Son, Sanford Arms and Sanford

Comedy career
- Years active: 1935–1996
- Medium: Stand-up; television; film
- Genres: Word play; observational comedy; Black comedy; blue comedy
- Subjects: Human sexuality; race relations; African-American culture

LaWanda Page (born Alberta Richmond; October 19, 1920 – September 14, 2002) was an American actress, comedian and dancer whose career spanned six decades. Crowned "The Queen of Comedy" or "The Black Queen of Comedy", Page melded blue humor, signifyin' and observational comedy with jokes about sexuality, race relations, African-American culture and religion. She released five solo albums, including the 1977 gold-selling Watch It, Sucker!, and collaborated on two albums with the comedy group Skillet, Leroy & Co. As an actress, Page is best known for portraying the Bible-toting and sharp-tongued Esther Anderson on the popular television sitcom Sanford and Son, which aired from 1972 until 1977. Page reprised the role in the short-lived television shows Sanford Arms (1976–1977) and Sanford (1980–1981). She also costarred in the 1979 short-lived series Detective School. Throughout her career, Page advocated for fair pay and equal opportunities for black performers.

== Early life ==
Page was born Alberta Richmond on October 19, 1920 in Cleveland. She was the daughter of Willie Richmond and Estella Small. She had an older sister, Anna (born 1912). She also had a younger sister named Lynn.

Page knew from a young age that she wanted to work in show business. In her youth, Page danced at the Friendly Inn Settlement in Cleveland, a community center run by the Women's Christian Temperance Union. Her family moved to St. Louis, Missouri, and she attended Banneker Elementary School, where she met Redd Foxx, two years her junior. Eventually, both entered the field of comedy separately and performed their own stage acts, working alongside each other on the Chitlin' Circuit and Foxx's TV sitcom Sanford and Son.

== Career ==
=== Dancing ===
Page began her career as a performer at age 15 in St. Louis, where she learned to fire dance. Her array of tricks included swallowing fire, lighting matches and cigarettes with her fingertips and walking over flames. She burned herself frequently in her early days, although never badly. However, she said that "if I had to burn to make a living, I was willing to burn". Billed as "The Bronze Goddess of Fire" or "LaWanda, the Flame Goddess", Page entertained in small St. Louis nightclubs. She later described one East St. Louis club where she worked as "the kind of place where if you ain’t home by nine o’clock at night you can be declared legally dead. [Everybody] walked around with knives in there. You better had one, too—knife or gun or something!" At some point, Page moved to Los Angeles, California, likely in the 1950s. Once there, Page took a gig dancing and waiting tables at the Brass Rail Club, where she remained for 15 years. She also toured her fire-dancing act and made appearances at nightclubs across the country and world, including Canada, Brazil and Japan.

=== Stand-up comedy ===
It is unknown when and where Page began stand-up comedy. She may have been introduced to stand-up while dancing at the Brass Rail Club. She stated that she did not like comedy at first, but a fellow Brass Rail Club employee and member of the comedy duo Skillet & Leroy saw Page's potential, telling her: "you can do comedy. As a matter of fact, if you don’t do comedy you can’t work here." Page may have also been introduced to stand-up while touring the Chitlin' Circuit, where she shared stages with noted comedians such as Redd Foxx and Richard Pryor.

In Los Angeles, Page developed the feisty approach to comedy that would make her famous. In the mid-1960s, she became a member of the comedy group Skillet, Leroy & Co. (before Page joined, the group was a duo known as Skillet & Leroy). Skillet was Ernest "Skillet" Mayhand (1916–2007) and Leroy was Wilbert LeRoy Daniel (1928–1993). During her tenure as a stand-up comic, a career she continued into the 1990s, Page often was billed as "The Queen of Comedy" or "The Black Queen of Comedy."

Page recorded five live solo comedy albums for the Laff Records label and several other collaborative live comedy albums with Skillet, Leroy & Co. in the late 1960s and early 1970s under her LaWanda Page stage name (although she was often billed by her first name only, sometimes styled as La Wanda). Other than the relatively clean Sane Advice album, released two years after the run of Sanford and Son, Page's albums and stand-up material were raunchy blue comedy in nature. One release, a gold-selling album titled Watch It, Sucker!, was titled after one of her Aunt Esther character's catchphrases in order to capitalize on her newfound television fame.

Page used the catchphrase again for the title of her 1982 stand-up tour named "The Watch It Sucker Review." When the New Pittsburgh Courier wondered why "'Aunt Esther' might do a show like this", Page explained that she was on tour because she needed the money and because she wanted to meet Aunt Esther's fans and perform her own stand up. The show was reviewed as "full of laughter and enjoyed by the large group who attended".

Page also performed as herself after her Sanford and Son fame. Between 1976 and 1978, Page appeared as a stand-up comedian on the Dean Martin Celebrity Roast, on which she roasted celebrities such as Frank Sinatra, Betty White and Jimmy Stewart.

In 1985, Page performed a raunchy set during the all-female stand-up special Women Tell the Dirtiest Jokes. Also included in the film were sets by, among others, Lois Bromfield, Marsha Warfield, Patty Rosborough, Carole Montgomery, and Judy Tenuta.

=== Acting ===
==== Sanford and Son (1973–1977) ====
Page had been performing her comedy routine in nightclubs in St. Louis and Los Angeles for several years, but had planned to leave show business to return to St. Louis to care for her ailing mother. However, a phone call from Redd Foxx in 1972 changed Page's mind. Earlier that year, the sitcom Sanford and Son, starring Foxx as Fred Sanford, had premiered on NBC. A man known for his generosity, Foxx brought Page to the attention of one of the show's producers, who was already familiar with Page and her act. Foxx then asked her to read for the role of Esther Anderson ("Aunt Esther"), the sister of Fred Sanford's late wife Elizabeth, and she was offered the role. However, prior to taping, producers became concerned when Page, whose experience was limited primarily to nightclub stages, seemed to have difficulty working in a sitcom format. When one of the show's producers told Foxx that Page must be fired before the show could begin taping. Foxx insisted that Page keep the role, threatening to abandon the show if Page were fired. Foxx said that "you never heard of the lady, but the night that first show of LaWanda's goes on the air, there'll be dancing in the streets in every ghetto in the United States." The producers relented and, after joining the series for the second season, Page's character of Aunt Esther became one of the most popular TV sitcom characters of the 1970s. Atlanta Daily World celebrated Page's success as a "Cinderella story come true", and the Pittsburgh Post-Gazette described Page's Aunt Esther as "a key ingredient” on Sanford and Son who "isn’t afraid of heathen Fred. She browbeats him at every turn in the tradition of God-fearing sisters who have seen the light and seek to quench the devil in a fun-loving man."

Page's Aunt Esther character was a devout churchgoer with a sharp tongue and verbally sparred with Foxx's character Fred Sanford. The devoutly religious Esther character contrasted sharply with the raunchy, expletive-filled material of Page's live act and records.

Sanford and Son ran for six seasons. After the sixth season, Foxx and his co-star Demond Wilson left the show over unfair treatment and pay disputes with the network, leading to Sanford and Son’s cancellation in 1977.

==== Sanford Arms (1977) and Sanford (1981) ====
Page continued her role as Aunt Esther on Sanford and Son spinoff series Grady and then Sanford Arms, which followed a new lead character, Phil Wheeler (Theodore Wilson). Without Foxx or Wilson, Sanford Arms received low ratings and was canceled after four episodes. A review in Variety noted that Page "is a genuinely funny lady, but she looked considerably better when she had Foxx to work with and against. Restraint is not her stock in trade, and [Theodore] Wilson is an inadequate counterbalance”. In 1980, NBC ran another spinoff of Sanford and Son called Sanford that entirely ignored the events of Sanford Arms. Foxx returned to play Fred Sanford, but Wilson did not return to portray Lamont Sanford. Page joined the series in 1981 for its second season to reprise her role as Aunt Esther. However, Sanford was plagued with low viewership and ratings, and NBC canceled the series during the 1981 season.

==== Other film, television, and recording appearances ====
In 1977, Page appeared in an episode of The Love Boat titled "A Tasteful Affair; Oh, Dale!; The Main Event" alongside Sherman Hemsley. Page also appeared on several episodes of The Dean Martin Celebrity Roasts, and over the next two decades occasionally guest-starred on other popular television shows, including Amen, Martin, 227, Family Matters and Diff'rent Strokes. Page costarred as Charlene Jenkins in the short-lived 1979 series Detective School. She appeared on Circus of the Stars as a fire eater. In the late 1990s and early 2000s, she appeared in a series of comical Church's Chicken television commercials featuring the catchphrase "Gotta love it!". She appeared on several songs on the debut album by RuPaul titled Supermodel of the World released in 1993, most notably the dance chart hit song "Supermodel (You Better Work)" where she delivered spoken word. She also appeared in several music videos from the album. She had a recurring role as Ms. Porter during the first season of the 1990s sitcom Martin.

Among Page's film credits are appearances in Zapped! (1982), Good-bye, Cruel World (1983), Mausoleum (1983), My Blue Heaven (1990), Shakes the Clown, (1991), CB4 (1993), Friday (1995) and Don't Be a Menace to South Central While Drinking Your Juice in the Hood (1996).

== Comedic style ==
Page used blue comedy, observational humor, character comedy and physical comedy to share vignettes about sexuality and religion that drew howling laughter from her audiences. She was one of the few women who performed extended spoken word pieces in the black signifying or toasting tradition. Scholar L. H. Stallings argues that through blue comedy, a genre often associated with men, Page and other black female comics in the genre "continue a Black female trickster tradition dedicated to creating oral cultures, divergent language practices, and initiatives to change definitions and boundaries of gender and sexuality in society”. In addition, Stallings writes that by speaking openly about her own sexual desires and pleasure, Page broke taboos and challenged dominant ideologies of black women's performances of gender and sexuality. Page's delivery and cadence was based in black folklore traditions, working-class vocabulary, speech patterns and black church sermons. The black church, argues scholar J. Finley, at times uplifted women's voices less than men's, so Page "dealt with women's silence in the church by transforming the sermon into a radical secular form via BWCL [Black women’s comic literacy] and blues idioms." Page infused jokes like "Whores in Church” from Watch It, Sucker! with lilting and rhythmic gospel vocals that, when coupled with her salacious humor, played with divisions between the sacred, secular, and lewd. Page employed slight impressions to distinguish the characters in her stories, but primarily relayed her tales as an omniscient narrator. She riffed off her audience, riling them up as she escalated her jokes. She also used physical comedy. At one rowdy 1989 performance in Richmond, Virginia, Page removed her underwear while on stage and auctioned it to the highest bidder in the increasingly rambunctious crowd.

== Filmography ==
=== Film ===
- Zapped! (1982) as Mrs. Jones
- Good-bye, Cruel World (1983) as Wilma
- Mausoleum (1983) as Elsie, the maid
- My Blue Heaven (1990) as Hotel Maid
- Talking Dirty After Dark (1991) as Angel/Devil
- Shakes the Clown (1991) as Female Clown Barfly
- CB4 (1993) as Grandma
- The Meteor Man (1993) as Old Nurse
- Friday (1995) as Old Lady
- Don't Be a Menace to South Central While Drinking your Juice in the Hood (1996) as Old School's Mom
- West from North Goes South (2004) as Mrs. Potter/Gertrude Potter (final film role; released posthumously)

=== Television ===
- Sanford and Son (1973 – 1977; 48 episodes) as Aunt Esther Anderson
- Grady (1975; 1 episode) as Aunt Esther Anderson
- Stonestreet: Who Killed the Centerfold Model? (1977; TV movie) as Erna
- The Love Boat (1977; 1 episode) as Stella Marshall
- Sanford Arms (1977; 1 episode) as Aunt Esther Anderson)
- Starsky and Hutch (1977 – 1979; 4 episodes) as Mrs. Swayder/Minnie/Lady Bessie
- Brothers and Sisters (1979; 1 episode) as Hattie
- Diff’rent Strokes (1979; 1 episode) as Myrtle Waters
- Detective School (1979; 12 episodes) as Charlene Jenkins
- B.A.D. Cats (1980; 1 episode) as Ma
- Sanford (1981; 7 episodes) as Aunt Esther Anderson
- Hill Street Blues (1983; 1 episode) as Apartment Fire Victim (uncredited)
- 1st & Ten (1985; 1 episode) as Earlene's Mother
- Amazing Stories (1985; 1 episode) as Aunt Esther Anderson
- 227 (1986; 1 episode) as Ethel
- Amen (1991; 3 episodes) as Darla
- Family Matters (1992; 1 episode) as Elmerita Puckerwood
- CBS Schoolbreak Special (1992; 1 episode) as Mrs. Wicker
- Martin (1992 – 1993; 4 episodes) as Evelyn Porter
- The Sinbad Show (1994; 1 episode) as Aunt Lula Mae
- The Parent 'Hood (1995; 1 episode) as LaWanda
- Dream On (1995 – 1996; 2 episodes) as Eddie's Grandmother (final television role)

== Personal life ==
Page was married and widowed three times. She married her first husband, John Peal, in 1934 at the age of 14, and before he died when she was 19, they had a son, who died in infancy in 1935, and a daughter, Clara. After her third husband died when Page was in her thirties, she decided to never remarry. Page was religious and affiliated with the Landmark Community Church during her first years in Los Angeles. In 1981, she became an evangelist in the Holiness Church. Her daughter, Clara, was an evangelist preacher.

== Death ==
Page died of a heart attack following complications from diabetes on September 14, 2002, at age 81. She is interred in an outdoor crypt at Inglewood Park Cemetery in Inglewood, California. Page's daughter, evangelist Clara Estella Roberta Johnson, died on June 4, 2006, in Los Angeles, California, at the age of 69.

== Legacy ==
Page followed in the footsteps of comic Moms Mabley along with carving her own path, making room for generations of future comics. Comedian and actress Thea Vidale called Page "a trailblazer who was never given the respect she deserved." Actress Myra J. recalled that Page was "the nicest woman; gave me great advice," and Tony Spires noted that Page "was underrated. A warm woman, nice and endearing with a lot of history from back in the day. Very cool and down to earth." Director Donald Welch remarked: "LaWanda lived the life she loved, and loved the life she lived."

== Discography ==
- Mutha Is Half a Word (1971)
- The Goodly Soul (1971; with Skillet & Leroy)
- Back Door Daddy (1972; with Skillet & Leroy)
- Preach On Sister, Preach On! (1973)
- Pipe Layin' Dan (1973)
- Watch It, Sucker! (1977)
- Sane Advice (1979)
