= Watch It, Sucker! =

Studio album by LaWanda Page
- Released: 1977
- Genre: Comedy
- Label: Laff

LaWanda Page chronology
Pipe Laying Dan (1973)	Watch It, Sucker! (1977)	Sane Advice (1979)

Watch It, Sucker! is the second and most acclaimed album released by American comic and actress LaWanda Page, who released the album in 1977 under the name of simply LaWanda.

This was Page's first album to feature musical accompaniment to create the "party album" atmosphere of albums by her contemporaries, including friends Redd Foxx and Rudy Ray Moore. As she was announced on her first live album, Page is introduced by the emcee as "the queen of comedy."

This album reached RIAA gold status on the strength of Page's success as Aunt Esther on the hit television show Sanford and Son, and was often sampled in hip-hop recordings.

The album includes the raunchy preacher-based routines that she later revised for her third solo album, Preach On Sister, Preach On!.

== Track listing ==
1. "Hoe House Blues"
2. "The Whores in Church"
3. "Crazy House"
4. "Bus Driver"
5. "Thermometer"
6. "Bye Bye Black Bird"
7. "Ring Dang Do"
8. "Star in the East"
9. "Darkie"
10. "The Buggy Ride"
11. "Welcome"
12. "Open Drawer Whores"
13. "Suck It Dry"
14. "Karate Monkey"
15. "The Hoe'in Game"
16. "It's Your Thing"
