= Chelsea (song) =

Single by Stefy

from the album The Orange Album
- B-side: "Cover Up"
- Released: July 18, 2006
- Recorded: 2006; 320 Studios (Los Angeles, California) Bombshelter Studios (Los Angeles, California)
- Genre: Bubblegum pop
- Length: 2:52
- Label: Wind-up
- Songwriters: Jimmy Harry; Greg Kurstin; Stefy Rae
- Producer: Jimmy Harry

Stefy singles chronology
"Chelsea" (2006)	"Fool for Love" (2006)

"Chelsea" is the debut single recorded by American pop rock band Stefy. It was released as the lead single from their debut album, The Orange Album (2006). It was sent to mainstream radio in June 2006 and was made available as a CD single and digital download by Wind-up Records on July 18. The song features a melody that is similar to The Eurythmics' "Sweet Dreams (Are Made of This)".

"Chelsea" was written by Jimmy Harry, Greg Kurstin and Stefy Rae, while production was handled by Harry. The song received mixed reviews from music critics, who favorably compared it to the works of Gwen Stefani and Blondie, but found it to be a "weak" debut single. The song was moderately successful after its release, peaking at number 15 on the Billboard Hot Dance Club Play, and playing a prominent role in the video game 2006 FIFA World Cup (2006).

== Background and release ==
"Chelsea" was written and produced during recording sessions in Los Angeles, California at 320 Studios and Bombshelter Studios. Sessions for Stefy's debut album, The Orange Album, began when lead singer Stefy Rae was "look[ing] for [a] sense of uniqueness" in the music industry. Rae stated that she was inspired to write "Chelsea" after another woman stole her boyfriend.

The single was written by Stefy lead singer Stefy Rae, Greg Kurstin, and Jimmy Harry, while production was handled solely by Harry. The track was released in 2006 as a CD single and digital download by Wind-up Records. The CD single version of "Chelsea" came with B-side track "Cover Up". The single was later issued to mainstream radio in June 2006, where it received modest success and significant airplay, charting on the Billboard Hot Dance Club Play for nine consecutive weeks.

== Composition and reception ==
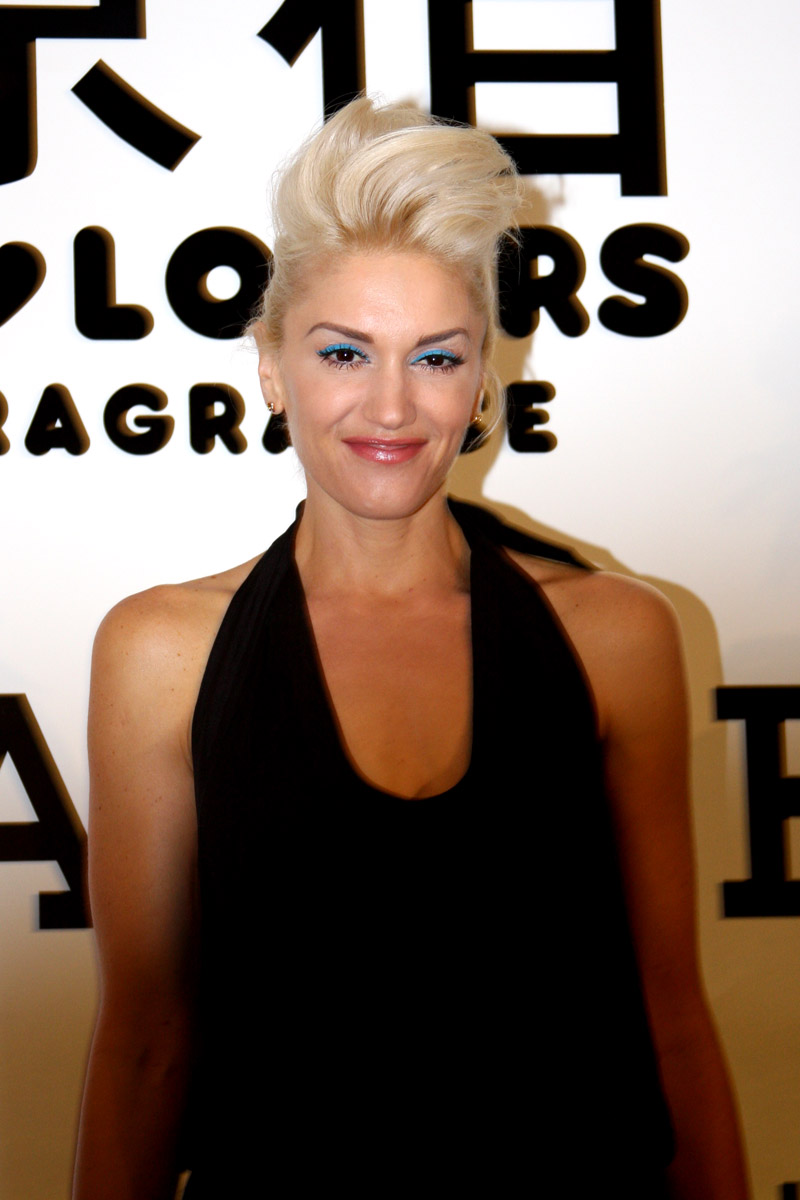
"Chelsea" was heavily compared to the works of Gwen Stefani.

Musically, "Chelsea" is a bubblegum pop and new wave track, referencing the music of the 1980s and 1990s. Chris Carle, writing for IGN, described the single as an "ode to jealousy" that started "with [a] Eurhythmics-style synth before launching into a snarling, almost-tough chorus." Marcus Duke for the Daily Express also noted the "sly sampling" of Eurhythmics, and stated "Stefy Rae has definitely been influenced by Gwen Stefani." Francis Petruziello of Domain Cleveland Entertainment wrote an album review of The Orange Album and stated "'Chelsea' kicks off [the] album with the pixie-like vocals of Stefy Rae singing about a boyfriend leaving her for another woman."

"Chelsea" received generally mixed reviews from music critics. Chris Carle of IGN praised the song for being a "standout track" and a "great blend of playful and painful". Similarly, Marcus Dunk of the Daily Express wrote that "Chelsea" was a highlight for Stefy. Francis Petruziello, writing for Domain Cleveland Entertainment, enjoyed the "danceable" qualities of the song. A reviewer of Billboard enjoyed the single, comparing it to Gwen Stefani and Blondie's work, but considered it "hardly a proper intro" on The Orange Album, however, the reviewer praised it for being a "delectably bubble gum" song. A critic from CMJ New Music Monthly was displeased with "Chelsea", stating that it's a "pale imitation of [a] classic decade-of-decadence act", referencing the song's sampling of "Sweet Dreams (Are Made of This)".

== Commercial performance ==
"Chelsea" was moderately successful. Due to strong airplay on mainstream dance radio, the single managed to peak at number fifteen on the Billboard Hot Dance Club Play; it remained on the charts for nine weeks before departing the chart on October 7, 2006. It also peaked at number eighteen on the Billboard Dance/Mix Show Airplay chart, where it lasted for four weeks. In Europe, the single also fared moderately well. In the United Kingdom, the track debuted and peaked at number eighty-two on the Official Charts Company. In Ireland, "Chelsea" debuted and peaked at number ninety-six.

== Music video ==
The official music video for "Chelsea" was first released on September 1, 2006 via YouTube, before being made available for purchase on September 13. The video was directed by Nigel Dick and features a guest appearance by Adam West as the judge of a court case. The video begins with Rae arriving at the scene of the case, surrounded by West and a group of female jurors who clap along to the song's melody. Presumably, Rae is trying to convict her ex-boyfriend of cheating on her. Various scenes include Rae performing at a school's gymnasium and picking a fight with a female antagonist named Chelsea. The video concludes with Rae winning the court case and walking away from the scene.

== Track listings and formats ==
- US CD single
1. "Chelsea" - 2:51
- UK CD single
1. "Chelsea" - 2:52
2. "Cover Up" – 3:41
- Sebastien Leger Remixes CD (US version)
1. "Chelsea (Sebastien Leger Mix)" - 6:23
2. "Chelsea (Sebastien Leger Mix) (Radio Edit)" - 3:24
- Sebastien Leger Remixes CD (UK version)
1. "Chelsea (Sebastien Leger Mix) (Radio Edit)" - 3:49
2. "Chelsea (Sebastien Leger Mix) (Club Mix)" - 6:31
- The Remixes CD (US version)
1. "Chelsea (Chris Cox Radio Mix)" - 3:30
2. "Chelsea (Chris Cox Club Mix)" - 10:03
3. "Chelsea (Chris Cox Dub Mix)" - 7:39
4. "Chelsea (Album Mix)" - 2:52
5. "Chelsea (Morgan Page Radio Mix" - 4:42
6. "Chelsea (Morgan Page Club Mix)" - 7:30
7. "Chelsea (Morgan Page Dub Mix)" - 7:31
- The Remixes CD (Denmark version)
1. "Chelsea (Original version)" - 2:50
2. "Chelsea (Chris Cox Club Mix)" - 10:03
3. "Chelsea (Chris Cox Dub Mix)" - 7:39
4. "Chelsea (Morgan Page Club Mix)" - 7:30
5. "Chelsea (Morgan Page Dub Mix)" - 7:29
6. "Chelsea (Sebastien Leger Mix)" - 6:29

== Credits and personnel ==
Credits and personnel adapted from The Orange Album liner notes

Recording

- Recorded at 3:20 Studios and Bombshelter Studios, Los Angeles

Personnel

- Stefy Rae – vocals, lyrics
- Andreas Brobjer – drums
- Bryan K. Christner – legal
- Chriss Fudurich – engineer
- Brian "Big Bass" Gardner – mastering
- Jason Gaviati – keyboards
- Benjamin Haber – photography
- Oren Hadar – engineer
- Jimmy Harry – engineer, guitar, keyboards, lyrics, production, programming
- Femio Hernandez – assistant mixing
- Greg Kurstin – lyrics
- Tom Lord-Alge – mixing
- Gail Marowitz – art direction
- Sean Meyer – guitar
- Mike Mongillo – coordinator
- Chad Nini – assistant engineer
- Bethany Pawluk – design
- Ben Tirney – assistant engineer

== Charts ==
Chart (2006–08)	Peak position
Ireland (IRMA)	96
Russia Airplay (Tophit)	282
Scottish Singles Sales (Official Charts)	35
UK Singles (Official Charts)	82
US Dance Club Songs (Billboard)	15
US Dance Airplay (Billboard)	18

== Release history ==
Region	Date	Format	Label
United States	June 2006	Mainstream radio	Wind-up Records
United States	July 18, 2006	CD single, digital download	Wind-up Records
United States	July 18, 2006	Sebastien Leger Remixes CD	Wind-up Records
United Kingdom	2007	CD single, digital download	Wind-up Records
Denmark	2007	Sebastien Leger Remixes CD	Wind-up Records
United States	February 12, 2007	The Remixes EP	The Bicycle Music Company
United Kingdom	February 12, 2007	The Remixes EP	The Bicycle Music Company
