= Charlene Incarnate =

American performer and writer

Charlene Incarnate is a Brooklyn-based performer and writer. She started her gender transition as a drag queen as part of her life experience.

== Early life and education ==
Charlene grew up in Alabama and moved to New York to attend New York University.

She began exploring the Brooklyn drag scene in the early 2010s.

== Work ==
Charlene is an ambassador and regular performer at the annual Bushwig festival held in Ridgewood, Queens. The weekend-long festival began in 2012 and has showcased more than 750 drag stars, artists, and performers from across the country and around the world. She was crowned Miss Bushwig 2017.

Charlene and Pixie Aventura, amongst other notable drag queens and performers such as Kevin Aviance, Flotilla Debarge, and Amanda Lepore, were featured in Wig, a 2019 documentary by Chris Moukarbel. The film follows the birth of the Wigstock drag festival from the 1980s and 1990s as well as the rebirth of the festival as Bushwig.

She has written and spoken about drag, gender and sexuality, and queer identity and the media for BuzzFeed News and Out Magazine. Charlene is the older sister of musical artist Mel 4Ever.
