= Wigstock: The Movie =

- Theatrical release poster
- Directed by: Barry Shils
- Produced by: Dean Silvers; Marlen Hecht
- Edited by: Tod Scott Brody
- Music by: Robert Reale
- Distributed by: The Samuel Goldwyn Company
- Release date: June 9, 1995
- Running time: 85 minutes
- Country: United States
- Language: English

Wigstock: The Movie is a 1995 documentary film focusing on Wigstock, the annual drag music festival that had been held New York City's East Village through the 1980s and 1990s. The film presents a number of performances from the 1994 festival, including Crystal Waters, Deee-Lite, Jackie Beat, Debbie Harry, Leigh Bowery, Joey Arias, Freddie Pendavis, and the Dueling Bankheads. The film also captures a performance by RuPaul at the height of his mainstream fame during the 1990s.

The film also goes behind the scenes, examining the rehearsal process of a number of the performers including Lypsinka and the "Wigstock Dancers." Members of the crew assembling the stage and attendees are interviewed about their experiences at the festival and some of the performers give interviews about the importance of drag and transgressive gender expression in their lives. One memorable moment features Wigstock MC Lady Bunny on the telephone with a city representative inquiring about the possibility of placing a wig on the Statue of Liberty.

== Reception ==
On Rotten Tomatoes the film has an approval rating of 80% based on reviews from 15 critics.

Roger Ebert of the Chicago Sun-Times gave it 2 out of 4, and wrote: "This movie puts a safe, public face on people who surely cannot be as conventional as they appear here."

== Soundtrack ==
Wigstock: The Movie

Soundtrack album by Various artists
- Released: 1995
- Genre: Pop, Dance
- Length: Approximately 75 minutes.
- Label: Sire Records
- Producer: Various producers

A soundtrack album for the film, featuring many of the performers included in the film, was released in 1995. In addition to the performances the CD includes comments delivered from the stage by Lady Bunny.

=== Song listing ===
1. Lady Bunny - "Calling Lady Liberty"
2. Lady Miss Kier - "Touch Me with Your Sunshine"
3. Erasure - "Cold Summer's Day"
4. Crystal Waters - "100% Pure Love"
5. NYG's - "The Real Thing"
6. Lady Bunny - "Mother Nature Must Be a Drag Queen"
7. Tabboo! - "It's Natural"
8. Jackie Beat - "Kiss My Ass"
9. Lady Bunny - "Intros RuPaul"
10. RuPaul - "Monologue"
11. RuPaul - "Free to Be"
12. Billie Ray Martin - "Space Oasis"
13. Chic - "Chic Cheer"
14. Mistress Formika - "Fight for Your Right (to Be Queer)"
15. Nancy Boy - "All That Glitters (Come Out Come Out)"
16. Lady Bunny - "Lady Bunny Intros Joey Arias"
17. Joey Arias - "Them There Eyes"
18. Lady Bunny - "Speaks Out"
19. Donna Giles with David Morales - "Gimme Luv"
20. Loveland - "Hope (Never Give Up)"
21. Jon of the Pleased Wimmin - "Passion"
22. Marc Almond - "What Makes a Man a Man"
23. Deee-Lite - "Somebody"
24. Lady Bunny - "Thanks for Coming"

== Home media ==
Wigstock: The Movie was released on Region 1 DVD on June 30, 2003.

== 1987 film ==
In 1987, filmmaker Tom Rubnitz filmed a 20-minute documentary, also titled Wigstock: The Movie. The short played the gay and lesbian film festival circuit in 1998. The title sequence of the 1995 Goldwyn film is cut from footage from the 1987 Rubnitz film.

== See also ==
- Wig
