= Freak of Nature (disambiguation) =

Freak of Nature is a 2001 album by Anastacia.

Freak(s) of Nature may also refer to:

- A freak (an aberration or abnormality)
- Freak of Nature (band), an American hard rock band
- Freak of Nature (Freak of Nature album), 1993
- "Freak of Nature", a song by Chris Crocker from The First Bite
- "Freak of Nature", a song by Mark Ronson and Dodgr from Spies in Disguise
- Freaks of Nature (Drain STH album), 1999
- Freaks of Nature (Kansas album), 1995
- Freak of Nature (Heart Attack Man album)
- Freaks of Nature, a 2012 concert tour by Kaskade
- Freaks of Nature (film), a 2015 film

== See also ==
- Freak (disambiguation)
- Nature (disambiguation)
