= Motorama (film) =

- Motorama DVD cover
- Directed by: Barry Shils
- Written by: Joseph Minion
- Produced by: Donald P. Borchers
- Starring: Martha Quinn; Flea; Michael J. Pollard; Meat Loaf; Drew Barrymore; Garrett Morris; Jordan Christopher Michael
- Cinematography: Joseph Yacoe
- Edited by: Peter H. Verity
- Music by: Andy Summers
- Distributed by: Two Moon Releasing
- Release date: September 10, 1991
- Running time: 90 minutes
- Country: United States
- Language: English
- Box office: $10,535 (US)

Motorama is a 1991 American black comedy road movie about a 10-year-old boy who drives a 1965 Mustang across a fictional landscape. The film features cameos by Drew Barrymore, Flea, Garrett Morris, Jack Nance, Robert Picardo, Martha Quinn, and Meat Loaf. It was directed by Barry Shils and written by Joseph Minion, the screenwriter of After Hours with whom Shils also worked on Vampire's Kiss.

== Plot ==
After a night of hearing his parents fight about the possibility of another mouth to feed and their lives so far, ten-year-old Gus decides to cash out his piggy bank and take off in a stolen Ford Mustang. He plans to collect all the MOTORAMA cards across the country, and claim the grand prize, which might set him up for a promising future. The cards are only available at specific, participating gas stations.

Everyone treats Gus like an adult. At a gas station, he indirectly causes an attendant, Phil, to be hit by a truck. Staying the night at a motel, he encounters the owner, who kills squirrels with exhaust fumes.

Leaving the next day and running low on money, Gus decides to steal some gas from a couple. However, they catch him and knock him out, damaging his eye socket. The couple brings him to their place, realizes he is a kid, and calls a doctor. However, instead of allowing surgical repair of the eye, they decline an operation. The couple later smears makeup on themselves and Gus, and it is implied that they molest him. The next morning, the wife say Gus can keep the gas and he leaves.

In low spirits and with no apparent way of finding more money or gas, he stops for food. Now wearing an eye patch over his lost eye, a biker identifies him as a pirate and challenges him to arm wrestle for money. Gus loses. The bikers humiliate him by branding him with a demeaning tattoo.

Stopped at a rest stop, still desperate for money, he gambles with a father over a game of horseshoes and wins. The father then decides to take this as a chance to abandon his children; he and his wife take off.

His journey nears completion with one letter remaining. Gus drives onward, through Essex, an industrial park where people fight, burn crosses, and take drugs. On a rain soaked highway he swerves to avoid a truck and drives his car off an unfinished bridge, damaging it so he can no longer drive.

Walking back along the road he encounters an older version of himself, driven crazy by the fact that he never found one last letter, the same one Gus is missing. Gus comes across a mentally handicapped gas station attendee and buys gas, only to receive just one card in return. However, it turns out to be the final letter he needs. His hair now gray, and viewed by everyone in the world as an old man, he heads off to the company offices to claim his prize.

At the company headquarters, a representative explains in the lobby that collecting all the letters does not make Gus a prize winner; he is just 'eligible' for the prize. Not giving up, Gus tries to meet with the company executives, but only gets as far as the secretary. Everyone now sees him as the small child he is, and treats him as such. The secretary explains that nobody is supposed to win Motorama. She congratulates him on collecting the letters, but says that there will be no prize. A security guard throws an enraged Gus out of the skyscraper window.

He lands in a pool of water, and then emerges from the same river that he stopped at after the first diner. His car is good as new, and his health is restored; his eye is back and his tattoo is gone. He throws away the metal leg extensions he made to enable himself to drive the car and hitchhikes back towards home. En route, he finds Phil has survived being hit by the truck, but is severely injured. Lacking other options, Gus decides to stay in Phil's gas station and work there to aid him. He is now back to being viewed as an adult, despite still being a child.

Gus later fills up the car of a gambler. He claims to have just won a million dollars and shows the cash to Gus. The gambler then drives away, only to die from the same accident Phil endured, hitting a truck head-on. Gus remains at the desolate gas station with Phil.

== Cast ==
- Martha Quinn as Bank Teller
- Flea as Busboy
- Michael J. Pollard as Lou
- Meat Loaf as Vern
- Drew Barrymore as Fantasy Girl
- Garrett Morris as Andy
- Jordan Christopher Michael as Gus
- Susan Tyrrell as The Bartender
- Mary Woronov as Kidnapping Wife
- Allyce Beasley as Chimera Receptionist
- Robin Duke as Miss Lawton
- Shelley Berman as Million Dollar Driver
- Jack Nance as Motel Clerk
- John Laughlin as Man at Wagon Wheel
- Dick Miller as Father in The Woods
- John Diehl as Phil
- Robert Picardo as Jerry
- Charles Tyner as Dying Man
- Sandy Baron as Kidnapping Husband
- Paul Willson as Cook

== Production ==
Filming took place in and around Page, Arizona, Lake Powell, Glen Canyon, Utah and the Fox Studio Lot in Century City, Los Angeles, California.
