= Lady Bunny =

American drag queen and actor

- Lady Bunny in 2008

Background information
- Also known as: "Bunny Hickory Dickory Dock"
- Born: Jon Ingle; August 13, 1962 (age 64); Wilmington, North Carolina, U.S.
- Origin: Chattanooga, Tennessee, U.S.
- Genres: Disco; dance-pop; Hi-NRG; disco house; R&B; Eurodance; electro
- Instruments: Turntables, vocals
- Years active: 1980–present
- Website: ladybunny.net

Lady Bunny, previously known as Bunny Hickory Dickory Dock (born Jon Ingle, August 13, 1962), is an American drag queen, nightclub DJ, actor, comedian, and event organizer. She is the founder of the annual Wigstock event, as well as an occasional television and radio personality. She has released disco singles such as "Shame, Shame, Shame!" and "The Pussycat Song", and has hosted two one-woman comedy shows, 'That Ain't No Lady!' and 'Clowns Syndrome'.

== Personal life ==
=== Early life and education ===
Lady Bunny was born in Wilmington, North Carolina, but grew up in Chattanooga, Tennessee, and describes her childhood as having been "wonderful and [she] lucked out in the parents department". Her mother was a retired registered nurse and her father is a history professor at the University of Tennessee at Chattanooga. Her parents were Quakers and peace activists.

Growing up, she would try on costumes and outfits, and put on plays with the other kids in the neighborhood. Her family lived next to a florist and she would collect the thrown out ribbons in the garbage and turn them into costumes for the plays.

When Bunny was 11, her family moved to Ghana for a year to accommodate her father, who had received a Fulbright Scholarship. "It was the best year of my life", she said, remembering banana trees in her backyard and a giant snake that slithered on the road. "I still gag West African cab drivers by speaking the remnants of Fante. I can only say a few things, but it tickles them like crazy." She briefly attended Bootham School, a Quaker boarding school in York, England. Based on her experiences, Bunny regards the English education system to be better than the American one. Upon graduating, she enrolled at the University of Tennessee, where her father teaches, but later relocated to Atlanta, where she attended Georgia State University.

=== Present ===
Lady Bunny says she has an affinity for trans women and has considered transitioning. She spends her public life in drag and uses she/her pronouns. Lady Bunny is seldom seen out of women's clothing. In a 2022 interview, Lady Bunny said "I guess if I had to label myself, I would say I'm probably nonbinary, but I don't feel the need to stipulate."

Lady Bunny currently lives in New York City. She does not often discuss personal matters, and has no known romantic partner or children. She is color blind, which affected her outfit choices.

=== Political views ===
Ingle said that she voted for Jill Stein in the 2016 U.S. Presidential Election.

Ingle has criticized members of the Democratic Party, including Kamala Harris and Hakeem Jeffries, citing their allegiance to corporate interests. She has also opposed Nancy Pelosi for her lack of support for abortion rights. Ingle expressed support for congressional candidate Melat Kiros in an interview with Briahna Joy Gray.

== Career ==
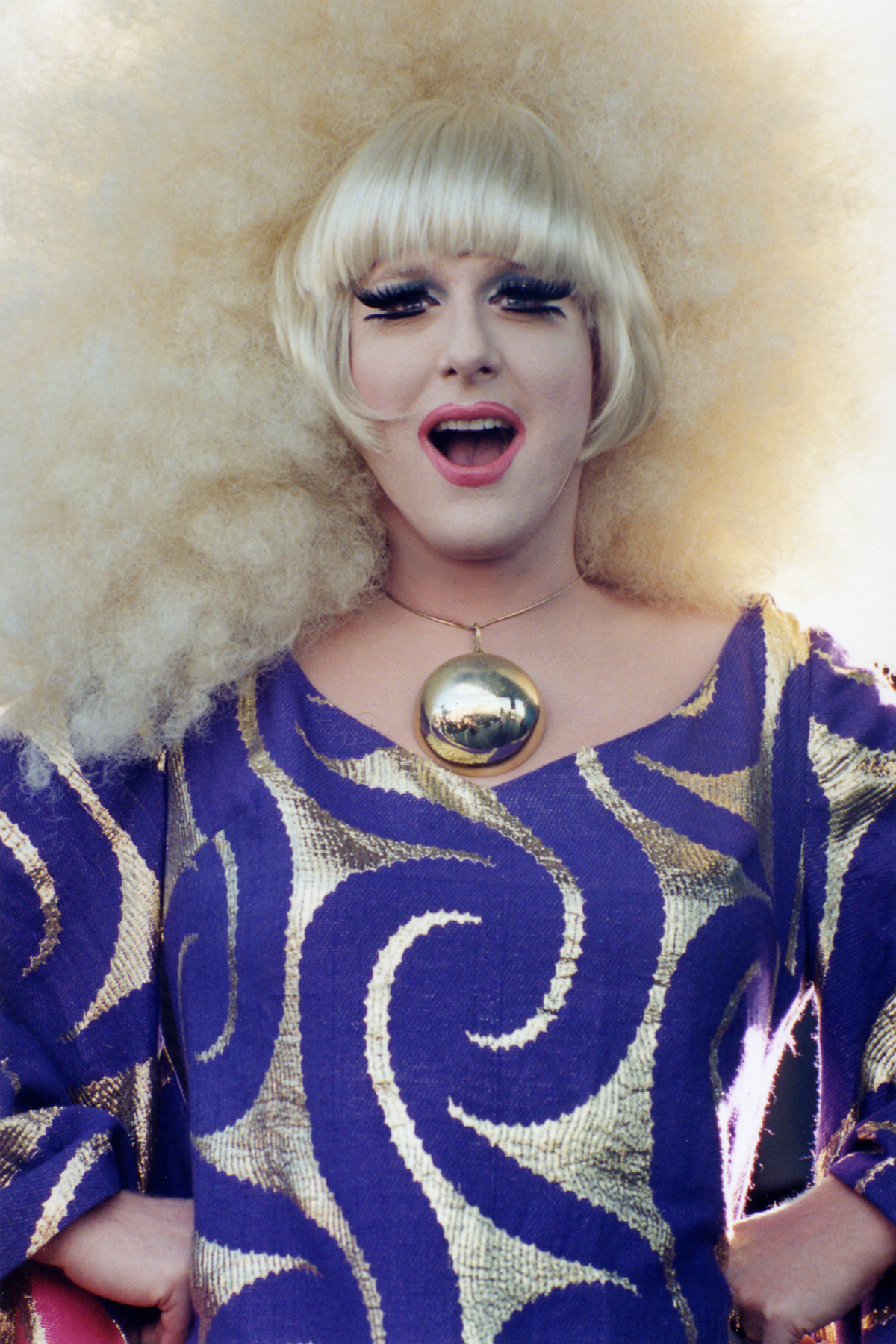
Lady Bunny in 2001

=== Early career ===
After university, Ingle became involved in Atlanta's growing LGBTQ nightlife during the early 1980s. There, Ingle met fellow drag performer RuPaul, who became a longtime friend and collaborator. Together with promoter Larry Tee, the pair became fixtures of the city's drag and nightclub scene, and for a time worked as go-go dancers for the band the Now Explosion.

Ingle also appeared with RuPaul in several low-budget films, including the Starbooty series. Years later, RuPaul recalled that he had been the first person to put Ingle in drag, technically making him Lady Bunny's drag mother.

In 1983, after several years in Atlanta, Ingle relocated to New York City with RuPaul. The two shared an apartment for a time and worked at the Pyramid Club, a venue that became a centre of the city's drag, performance art, and queer nightlife.

One of Ingle's first performances in New York was a lip sync to Gloria Gaynor's "I Will Survive", during which Ingle fell onstage, losing both a wig and a shoe. During this period, Ingle developed a performance style that blended lip sync, dance and comedy, often combining self-deprecating humour with playful criticism of other performers between short dance routines. To support a career in nightlife, Ingle also worked a series of day jobs, including in an ice cream parlour and in sales for publisher Ralph Ginzburg.

=== Wigstock ===
Soon, Lady Bunny became one of the Club Kids and in 1985, she organized the first Wigstock, an annual drag queen festival that lasted until 2005, and was later revived in 2018. The idea to revive Wigstock came from David Burtka. Wigstock became the subject of Chris Moukarbel's 2019 documentary Wig, which included Debbie Harry, Kevin Aviance, Willam, and Neil Patrick Harris.

=== Television and film ===
Beginning in the early 2000s, Ingle expanded beyond nightclub performance into film and television. In 2003, Ingle made a guest appearance as the emcee at an LGBTQ prom in the Sex and the City episode "Boy, Interrupted". Two years later, in 2005, Ingle appeared as a roaster on the Comedy Central roast of actress and model Pamela Anderson and released the comedy DVD Rated X for X-tra Retarded.

From 2010 to 2012, Ingle served as Dean of Drag and a judge on RuPaul's Drag U, a reality television spin-off of RuPaul's Drag Race. During the second season, the role was expanded with the recurring "Lady Lessons" segment. In 2013, drag performer Alaska Thunderfuck 5000 impersonated Lady Bunny during the Snatch Game on the fifth season of RuPaul's Drag Race. Six years later, in 2019, the fifth episode of the fourth season of RuPaul's Drag Race All Stars, "Roast in Peace", featured a mock funeral in which contestants roasted Lady Bunny.

Beginning in 1995, Ingle appeared in films including Party Girl, To Wong Foo, Thanks for Everything! Julie Newmar, and Wigstock: The Movie. Later film appearances included Peoria Babylon (1997), Another Gay Movie (2006), and Starrbooty (2007). In 2019, Ingle appeared in the documentary Wig, directed by Chris Moukarbel, which chronicles the history and revival of Wigstock.

In 2021, Ingle appeared in NewsBeat, a news and political satire programme written by Luke Evendon and executive produced by singer and television personality Clay Aiken.

=== Music and DJ work ===
Since the mid-1990s, Jon Ingle has balanced recording original music with an international career as a nightclub DJ. Ingle began releasing original music in 1996, including the singles "Shame, Shame, Shame!" and "The Pussycat Song".

As a DJ, Ingle has toured internationally with cabaret productions and performed at clubs, fashion events and LGBTQ community events around the world. Ingle was the DJ for French jewellery company Van Cleef & Arpels' 40th anniversary celebration in Paris and for the Standard Hotel's Black Out Party, which marked the 25th anniversary of British supermodel Naomi Campbell's fashion career.

Ingle has served as the regular DJ for the Empire State Pride Agenda, an LGBTQ advocacy organization. Ingle has also been the in-house DJ for the art and fashion magazine Visionaire and the fashion magazine V.

In interviews, Ingle has identified "Fade Away and Radiate" by the American rock band Blondie as a favourite song. Ingle has also regularly included Canadian singer-songwriter Kiesza's "Hideaway" in DJ sets, describing it as a popular but underrated pop song.

=== Performance ===
Lady Bunny is known for her "big curves, bigger hair" and is still performing today. She frequently attends New York Fashion Week, tours alongside cabaret shows, and DJs around the globe.

Lady Bunny has written and run two one-woman comedy shows at LGBT club La Escuelita, 'That Ain't No Lady!' and 'Clowns Syndrome', the latter receiving praise from The New York Times. Both comedy shows toured globally.

Bunny can put together a full drag look within 20 minutes and maintains that every drag look must include faux lashes and a good wig. Her style of drag performance is comedic and often involves the parodying of popular songs. She most often appears in blonde wigs, and frequently performed at XL Nightclub. She has shared the stage with other popular New York City Drag Queens like Bianca del Rio. Lady Bunny was featured on the European leg of the Werq the World Tour.

Lady Bunny is featured prominently in "The Tyranny of Consciousness", a 2017 five-channel video installation by video artist Charles Atlas, which premiered at "Viva Arte Viva", the 2017 Venice Biennale, curated by Christine Maciel. The video is now in the permanent collection of the Hammer Museum, Los Angeles.

During the COVID-19 pandemic, Lady Bunny produced an online drag show called 'Cuntagious'. In January 2021, she launched a podcast, Ebony and Irony, co-hosted by Monét X Change.

=== Writing ===
Lady Bunny worked as a commentator for Star Magazine's 'Worst of the Week' column. She has also written for Paper Magazine, Interview, Out, Time Out, Visionaire, and Huffington Post. According to her own website, she is currently working on a memoir.

=== Controversy ===
At the 2024 Pridelines Masquerade Gala, Lady Bunny faced backlash after making controversial remarks during her acceptance speech, including jokes targeting local drag performer and Pridelines supporter Tiffany Fantasia. The incident followed weeks of criticism over Lady Bunny's outspoken comments on social media, where she criticized Vice president Kamala Harris and her presidential campaign, accusing her of being an insufficiently progressive "vessel for corporate interests", causing tension among LGBTQ Democrats. In response to the backlash, Pridelines issued an apology, rescinded Lady Bunny's National Icon Award, and reaffirmed their support for Fantasia, emphasizing the gala's intended focus on unity and community.

== Awards and nominations ==
- 2009 GayVN Awards winner of Best Non-Sex Performance in "Brothers' Reunion" (Lucas Entertainment).
- 2009 AmfAR's Honoring with Pride Honoree

== See also ==
- Drag culture in New York City
- LGBTQ culture in New York City
- List of LGBTQ people from New York City
