= Barry Shils =

American film professional

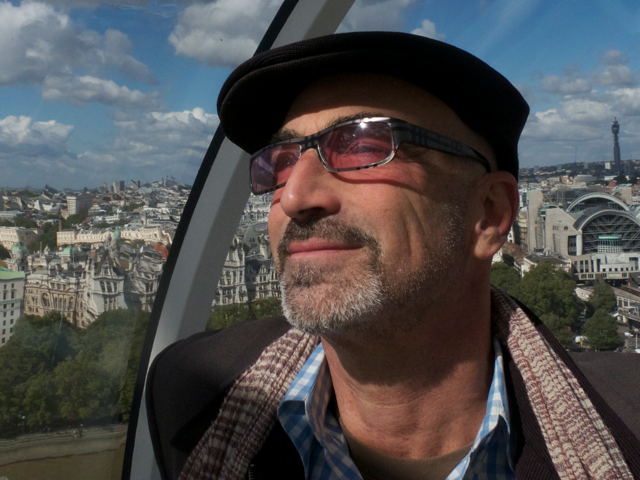

Barry Shils is an American film director and producer. He is best known for directing and producing the films Motorama and Wigstock: The Movie, and for producing Vampire's Kiss starring Nicolas Cage.

== Early life ==
Born in Philadelphia, Shils became an integral part of the vibrant downtown New York City art scene in the late 1970s and early 1980s. A graduate of Yale University, he is the son of academic, Dr. Edward B. Shils (deceased 2004) a professor at the Wharton School of Business at the University of Pennsylvania and Founder of the Wharton Entrepreneurial Center. Shils' grandparents on both sides were first generation Americans of Russian Jewish descent.

== Career ==
Shils' films and videos from the 1970s and early 1980s are part of the New York Museum of Modern Art collection. Inspired by the fertile Club 57 scene, titles include "Beehive", "The Jones", "Love Comix", and "Lady Wrestling". Shils and his various collaborators: Steve Brown, Jim Self, Ellie Nagler and Frank Moore were honored by the screening of the films in the 2017-2018 MoMA show “Club 57: Film, Performance, and Art from the East Village, 1978-1983.”

Throughout the 1980s and 1990s, Shils was active in the independent film scene. In 1989 he produced Vampire's Kiss, a dark comedy written by Joseph Minion. The film stars Nicolas Cage and Jennifer Beals. He has been a member of the Directors Guild of America since 1998.

Shils directed Motorama (also penned by Minion) a surrealistic tale of a 10-year-old boy who drives a 1965 Mustang across a fictional landscape. Motorama features Drew Barrymore, Flea, Jack Nance and Meat Loaf, with a soundtrack by Andy Summers of The Police. Distributed by Columbia-TriStar Home Entertainment, a division of SONY Pictures.

Shils formed Goldstreet Pictures, producing and directing Wigstock: The Movie, a musical documentary chronicling the largest drag performance festival in the world at the time of the AIDS crisis. The movie features performances by Lady Bunny, RuPaul, Lypsinka, Alexis Arquette, Jackie Beat, and Leigh Bowery Distributed by The Samuel Goldwyn Company and MGM Home Entertainment. Included in the collection of the UCLA Film Archive, Wigstock’s 20th Anniversary was celebrated by screenings at The Hammer Museum’s Billy Wilder Theater, the Museum of Modern Art and The Anthology Film Archives.

Shils produced and directed 10 episodes of HBO's reality series America Undercover: Real Sex, including "Ladies' Night" and "Doris Wishman: Queen of Sexploitation", a portrait of the trailblazing female film director.

Shils has produced and directed documentaries dealing with social issues. Doing Justice explores alternatives to incarceration for teenagers in the juvenile justice system. His most recent film, Generation A: Portraits of Autism and the Arts, focuses on young artists on the autism spectrum. Also featuring Temple Grandin, Stephen Shore and Joanne Lara (Founder of Autism Movement Therapy). Generation A was broadcast on PBS throughout 2015 – 2017 and received the "Raising Autism Awareness Award" at The Golden Door International Film Festival.

Shils was assistant director, production manager and associate producer on five thrillers written, produced and directed by Larry Cohen, including The Stuff with Michael Moriarty, Island of the Alive starring Karen Black, and A Return to Salem's Lot.
