= Lip Sync LaLaPaRuza Smackdown =

Lip Sync LaLaPaRuza Smackdown may refer to any of the following Drag Race episodes:

- "LaLaPaRUza", RuPaul's Drag Race All Stars (season 4)
- "LaLaPaRUza Brasil", Drag Race Brasil (season 2)
- "Lip Sync LaLaPaRuZa Smackdown" (RuPaul's Drag Race All Stars season 7)
- "Lip-Sync LaLaPaRuZa Smackdown" (RuPaul's Drag Race All Stars season 9)
- "Lip Sync LaLaPaRuza Smackdown" (RuPaul's Drag Race season 15)
- "Lip Sync LaLaPaRuza Smackdown – Reunited", RuPaul's Drag Race (season 16)
- "Lip Sync Lalaparuza Smackdown" (RuPaul's Drag Race season 17)
- "Lip Sync Lalaparuza Smackdown", a 2025 episode of Drag Race Philippines: Slaysian Royale
