= Internet addiction in South Korea =

Internet addiction in South Korea, which is primarily an addiction to video games or online gambling, has affected many in the South Korean population. In a 2012 estimation, which defined cellphone addiction as using it for more than 8 hours per day, the South Korean government predicted 2.55 million people were addicted to their phones. There are many different treatments used for internet addiction in South Korea, which around 25% of internet addicted South Korean teenagers attend.

== Background ==
In 2018, 20% of South Koreans have a high chance of getting an internet addiction. In 2012, the government of South Korea estimated 2.55 million people are addicted to their phones, being defined as using their smartphone for 8 hours per day.

A study in the Korean Journal of Family Medicine found that children in South Korea who are at a high chance of internet addiction smoke cigarettes, drink alcohol, abuse drugs, and have sexual intercourse more often than those at a low risk. The study dismissed the idea that internet addiction causes these effects, believing that whatever caused the affected people's internet addiction also caused their other problems.

== Video games ==
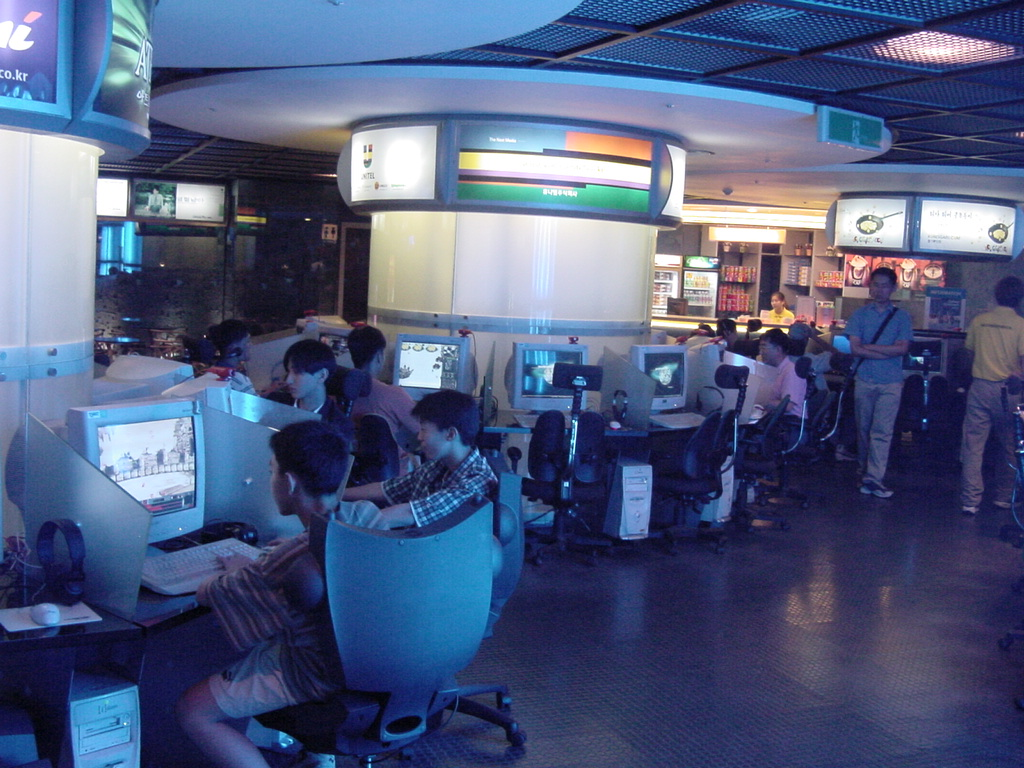
The interior of a PC bang in South Korea. The couple was inside a PC Bang while their infant died.

A couple's distraction with video games led to them letting their infant starve to death in 2009. The couple was later convicted of homicide due to the infant's death. The documentary Love Child was based on the events of the couple.

The Shutdown law, which banned people under the age of 16 from accessing video games from midnight to 6 am, was passed in 2011, but the Ministry of Culture, Sports and Tourism and the Ministry of Gender Equality and Family scrapped the law ten years later in favor of a system where parents of children and the children themselves could choose their own limits. While the policy was able to decrease video game addiction with females under the age of 16, it had no significant effect on males, which make up a majority of video game addicts. This is due to females being more likely to follow similar policies than males.

== Online gambling ==
According to the Gender Equality and Family Ministry, 28,838 teenagers were at risk of online gambling addiction in 2023. Lee Hae-kook, a professor of the Catholic University of Korea College of Medicine, stated that this phenomenon was due to teenagers' familiarity and ease of access to the internet.

An illegal online market of "Moneymen" has arisen within online poker games in South Korea. In this practice, Moneymen would intentionally lose to their clients, which would give the client the Moneyman's points in exchange for money. This practice has been used to take advantage of online gambling addicts by letting them go over the 300,000 won per month limit on spending on online gambling sites.

== Treatment ==
Around 25% of teenagers with an internet addiction are sent to government-sponsored centers. From 2014 to 2019, 1,200 South Koreans attended an internet addiction camp. As of 2023, the National Center for Youth Internet Addiction Treatment is the only rehab center with programs for online gambling addiction.

One treatment method is the use of biofeedback therapy, after which doctors would play footage of video games to see how long the person could last without having the urge to pick up a controller. Another method is the use of military-esque obstacle courses alongside drill instructors. A third method is horse riding.
