= Roast in Peace =

Episode of RuPaul's Drag Race All Stars

- RuPaul's Drag Race All Stars episode
- Episode no.: Season 4 Episode 5
- Presented by: RuPaul

Guest appearances
- Yvette Nicole Brown (guest judge); Cecily Strong (guest judge); Stacy Layne Matthews

Episode chronology
← Previous "Jersey Justice"	Next → "LaLaPaRUza"
- RuPaul's Drag Race All Stars (season 4)

"Roast in Peace" is the fifth episode of the fourth season of the American television series RuPaul's Drag Race All Stars. It originally aired on January 11, 2019. The episode's main challenge tasks the contestants with performing stand-up comedy in a roast of Lady Bunny and the judges in front of a live audience. Yvette Nicole Brown and Cecily Strong are guest judges.

== Episode ==
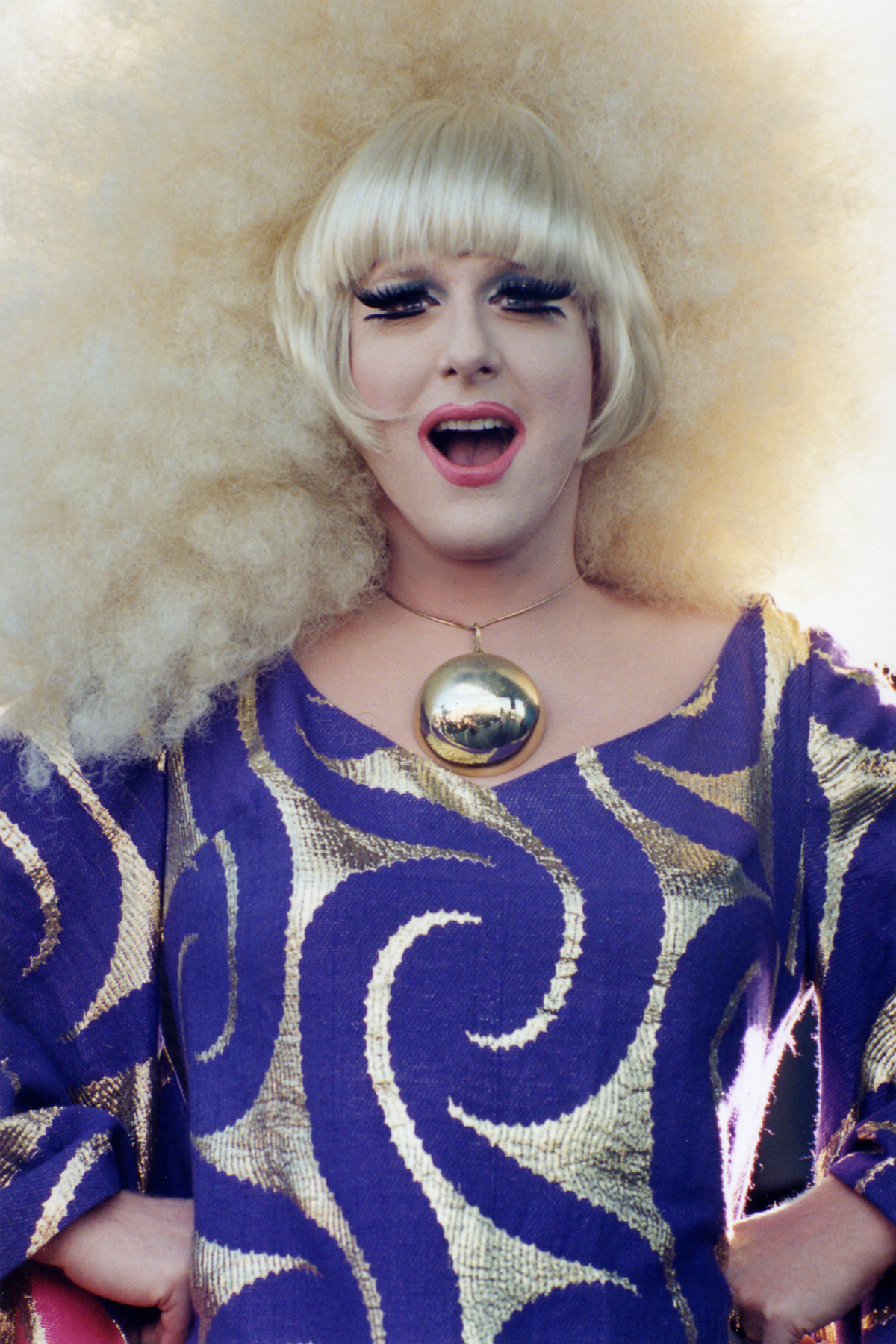
Lady Bunny (pictured in 2001) is a special guest.

The contestants return to the workroom after Latrice Royale's elimination on the previous episode. Manila Luzon reveals that she would have eliminated Monét X Change from the competition, had she won the lip-sync contest. On a new day, RuPaul greets the group and reveals the main challenge, which tasks the contestants with performing stand-up comedy in a roast of Lady Bunny and the judges in front of a live audience. The contestants must write a humorous eulogy. Monique Heart gets to select the performance order.

Monique Heart shares the line-up, then the contestants start to write their eulogies. RuPaul returns to the workroom to meet with each contestant, asking questions and offering advice. Before leaving, RuPaul reveals that Yvette Nicole Brown and Cecily Strong are guest judges.

The contestants get coaching from Strong on the main stage. On elimination day, the contestants make final preparations in the workroom for the roast. The group discuss the elimination process. On the main stage, RuPaul welcomes fellow judges Michelle Visage and Ross Mathews, as well as guest judges Brown and Strong. RuPaul shares the assignment of the main challenge, then the roast commences.

RuPaul announces the runway category ("Angelic White"), then the fashion show commences. After the contestants present their looks, the judges deliver their critiques, then share the results with the group. Manila Luzon and Monét X Change are announced as the top two contestants. Monique Heart, Naomi Smalls, Trinity the Tuck, and Valentina are announced as the bottom four contestants. The contestants deliberate in the workroom, then Manila Luzon and Monét X Change face off in a lip-sync contest to "Jump to It" (1982) by Aretha Franklin. Both are both declared winners. RuPaul then announces that all-star rules have been suspended temporarily and that no one will be eliminated from the competition. The contestants return to the workroom to discover a message on the mirror: "Get ready to lip sync for your life, life, life, life." Lady Bunny is seen behind the mirror. She tells the contestants to turn around, revealing the return of the eliminated competitors Farrah Moan, Gia Gunn, Latrice Royale, and Jasmine Masters, wearing funeral attire.

== Production ==
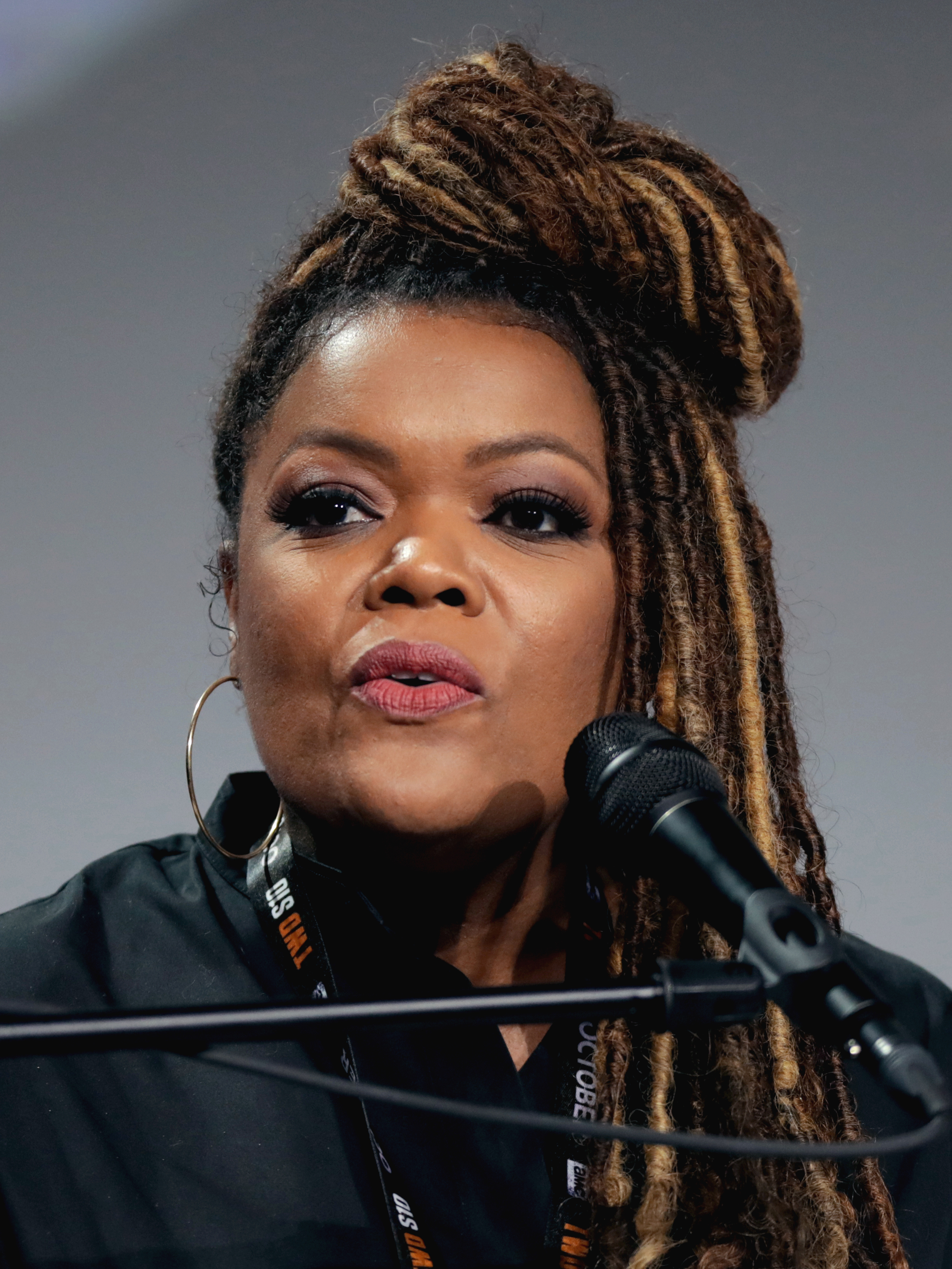
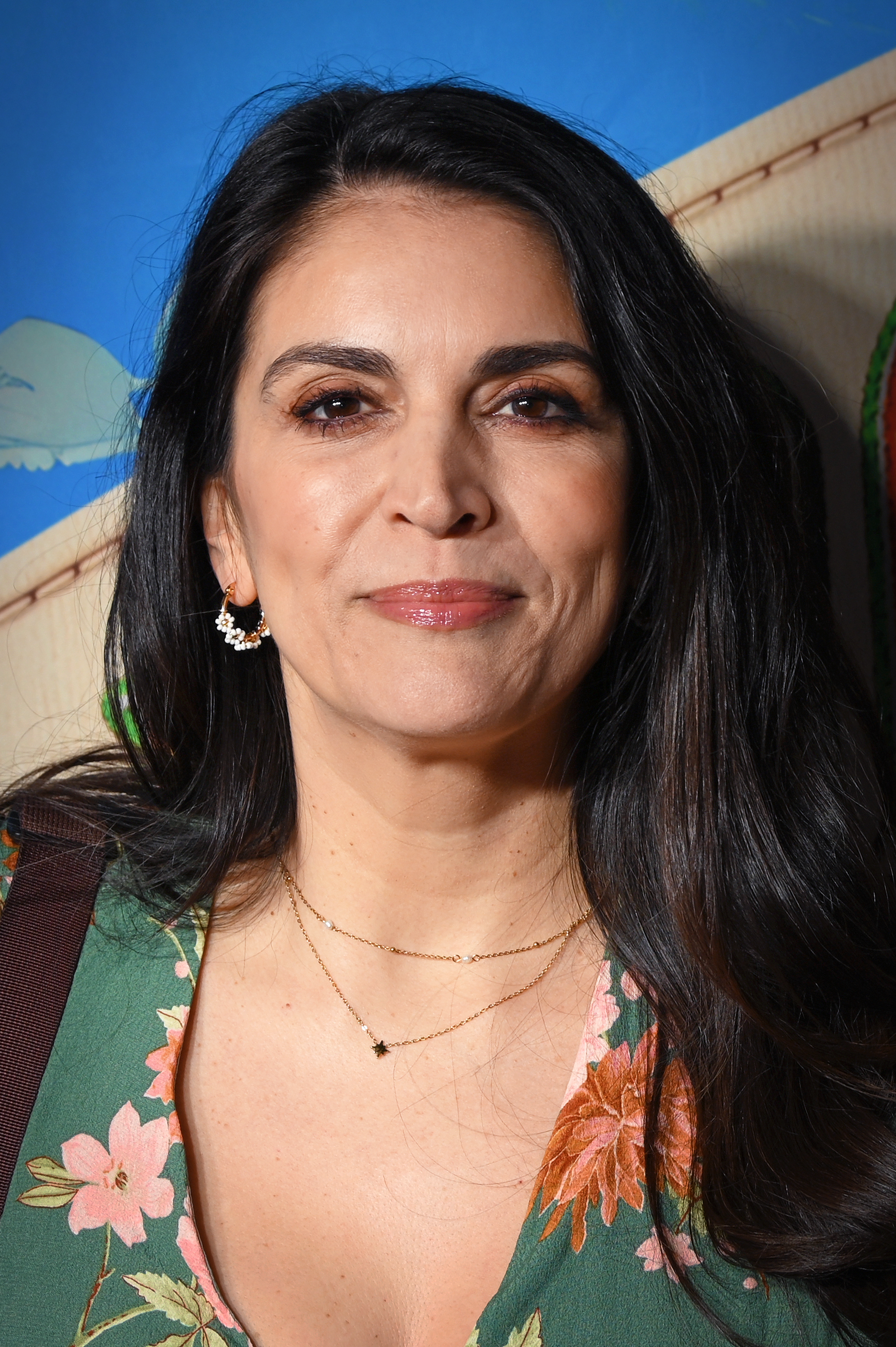
Yvette Nicole Brown (left, pictured in 2019) and Cecily Strong (right, pictured in 2026) are guest judges.

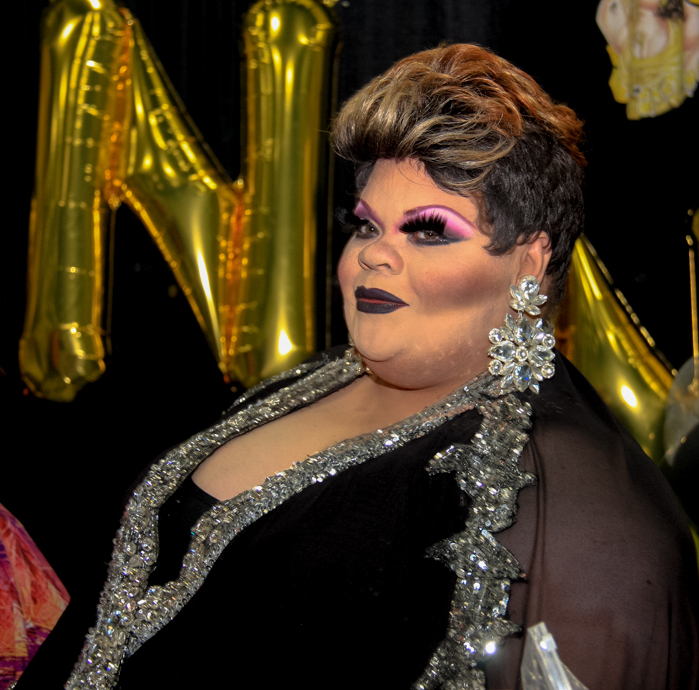
Stacy Layne Matthews (pictured at RuPaul's DragCon LA in 2018) makes a cameo appearance.

The episode originally aired on January 11, 2019.

Stacy Layne Matthews makes a cameo appearance for the main challenge. During the lip-sync, both contestants "pull out all the stops for one of the funniest and evenly matched lip syncs of the season", according to Pride.com.

=== Fashion ===
For the main stage, RuPaul wears a pink-and-orange dress with orange earrings and a large blonde wig. For the main challenge, Lady Bunny has a colorful outfit and a large blonde wig. Monét X Change wears gloves, a pearl necklace, and a blonde wig. Trinity the Tuck has a dark wig and a fascinator. Monique Heart and Naomi Smalls wear blonde wigs. Valentina has white sunglasses, a black scarf, and a blonde wig. Manila Luzon enters with an umbrella. She has a red necklace and a matching headpiece.

For the fashion show, the contestants wear white. Monét X Change's outfit has a long train, which she removes. She has tall boots, a blonde wig, and a tall hat. Trinity the Tuck has an angel-inspired outfit and a headpiece with wings. Monique Heart wears an asymmetrical dress and a headpiece. Naomi Smalls has a Prince-inspired look and she carries a guitar. She wears gold earrings and a dark wig. Valentina has a gown with gold knots, ostrich feathers, and crystals, as well as a blonde wig. Manila Luzon wears an angel- and goddess-inspired dress with a blonde wig and a headpiece with wings.

== Reception ==
Kate Kulzick of The A.V. Club gave the episode a rating of 'B' and said Monique Heart's performance was "strong". Writing for Vulture, Matt Rogers rated the episode four out of five stars. Paul Hagen of Metrosource said both contestants delivered "impressive" performances during "Jump to It". Kevin O’Keeffe of Xtra Magazine said Strong was among the season's best guest judges. Charlie Jones of PinkNews said Naomi Smalls's Prince-inspired look was her best of the season. Sam Brooks ranked the "Jump to It" performance number 57 in The Spinoff's 2019 "definitive ranking" of 162 Drag Race lip-syncs to date.

== See also ==
- "RuPaul Roast" (RuPaul's Drag Race season 5), 2013 episode
- "RuPaul Roast" (RuPaul's Drag Race season 9), 2017 episode
- "The Ross Mathews Roast" (2022), episode of RuPaul's Drag Race
- "The Villains Roast" (2025), episode of RuPaul's Drag Race
