= Ghost in the Machine (2026 film) =

- Directed by: Valerie Veatch
- Written by: Valerie Veatch
- Produced by: Valerie Veatch
- Distributed by: ITVS
- Release date: January 26, 2026 (Sundance)
- Running time: 110 minutes
- Country: United States
- Language: English

Ghost in the Machine is a 2026 American documentary film produced, written, and directed by Valerie Veatch. The film explores artificial intelligence through the history of human advancement in technology, with a focus on eugenics advocacy among Silicon Valley's founders. It premiered at the 2026 Sundance Film Festival.

== Reception ==
On the review aggregator website Rotten Tomatoes, 78% of 18 critics' reviews are positive, with an average rating of 7.3/10.

Chase Hutchinson of TheWrap wrote that the film "is a radical, necessary Molotov cocktail of a documentary that's being thrown right into the heart of our nonsense, nightmarish world of overinflated AI hype."

Jason Gorber of Point of View wrote that it "is in many ways a perfect film of the age – messy, argumentative, grasping at answers in what feels to be a state of deep uncertainty."
