= Better Out Than In =

2013 art installation by Banksy

- Promotional poster
- Date: October 2013
- Location: New York City
- Type: Artist residency
- Participants: Banksy
- Website: banksy.co.uk

Better Out Than In was a residency undertaken by the pseudonymous graffiti artist and political activist Banksy in New York City during October 2013. Banksy unveiled at least one work of art daily, documenting it on both a dedicated website and an Instagram account. The majority of the works were stencil graffiti and chiefly political, a distinctive characteristic of Banksy. Other pieces and multimedia exhibits toyed with dark humor and satire.

The unpredictability of the show and Banksy's elusive nature stirred excitement amongst fans, while defacement from competing street artists and vandals became an imminent problem. While Banksy's works were inherently illegal, no official complaints were reported to the police; most property owners praised the art and some took measures to protect it. The month-long residency drew controversy amongst some locals for its more politically strong pieces, and received mixed reviews from critics.

An HBO documentary film covering this period and residency titled Banksy Does New York was released in 2014.

== Background ==
On 1 October 2013, Banksy announced on his website that he would be attempting to host a show in New York City for the entire month. This came after posters promoting an October event started showing up in Los Angeles.

The title Better Out Than In is a reference to a quote by impressionist Paul Cézanne, "All pictures painted inside, in the studio, will never be as good as those done outside."

In an interview with The Village Voice, Banksy said "New York calls to graffiti writers like a dirty old lighthouse. We all want to prove ourselves here," and that he chose it for the high foot traffic and hiding places.

== Works ==
The works Banksy has included in Better Out Than In primarily consist of stencil graffiti, much of which are political in nature. His first installment, which he captioned "the street is in play", depicted a child reaching for a bottle of spray paint on a sign reading "graffiti is a crime". The sign was stolen and later replaced by Queens-based graffiti group Smart Crew with a new sign that read "street art is a crime". Like most of his other works, the piece has audio accompaniment that can be heard either on the website or by calling a toll-free 800 number.

In the East Village, Banksy's fifth work was housed in a delivery truck as a "mobile garden," which included theatrical property showing a rainbow, waterfall, and butterflies. The following day Banksy posted a photo of a tracking device he found under the vehicle.

Banksy's installments are located all across the five boroughs, with some being purely multimedia exhibits. On 6 October, as a way to have made an installment in Dumbo, Brooklyn, a primary arts district of the city, Banksy posted a video featuring the Walt Disney character Dumbo being shot down by Syrian rebels, the meaning behind which puzzled many.

On 9 October, Banksy unveiled one of the more elaborate and politically strong pieces of the series. It featured armed soldiers and horses spray-painted on a car and trailer in an empty lot on the Lower East Side. Instead of commentary about the work, the accompanying audio was that of a classified video from the July 12, 2007, Baghdad airstrike. After being dismantled, the car was towed away to prevent further defacement.

Day 11 saw an elaborate political display questioning the "casual cruelty" of the meat industry. Entitled Sirens of the Lambs, Banksy drove around a military-style cargo truck filled with squealing, stuffed animatronic livestock. The truck fittingly made its debut in Meatpacking District, Manhattan, but toured the rest of the city in the following weeks.

On 13 October, Banksy made headlines when it was revealed that the art an older man was selling outside Central Park was actually authentic, signed Banksy canvases, sold for only $60 each. Having not announced this beforehand, tourists and park goers were unaware of the value the paintings had, which the BBC estimated could be upwards of $32,000 each. Banksy posted a video on his website chronicling the surprise sale, which revealed that a total of seven paintings were sold for $420 taking. A woman from New Zealand who bought two for $60 each later sold them for £125,000 at a London auction in 2014.

Banksy unveiled one of his most controversial pieces of the series on 15 October, with a depiction of the Lower Manhattan skyline featuring the former Twin Towers, with a burnt-orange chrysanthemum in place where one of the hijacked airplanes struck the North Tower. The silhouette appeared on the side of a building in TriBeCa, with an identical depiction along the Brooklyn Heights Promenade, facing the downtown skyline. The Brooklyn Heights piece was eventually buffed out by the city, requiring chemicals and a high-powered pressure washer. The removal followed a taunt Banksy had directed toward the city on his website. Meanwhile, the sister piece in TriBeCa served as a shrine, people placing flowers next to it, as well as a letter asking no one to touch the painting. Acrylic glass was eventually installed to protect the piece, before someone painted over it.

Banksy extended his work beyond the canvas and city street with other political statements, including on 16 October, when he crafted a giant fiberglass sculpture of Ronald McDonald, with a real live Banksy assistant shining its shoes. It was unveiled in the Bronx but was moved outside of a different McDonald's restaurant across the city around lunch time for several days. The work criticized the "heavy labor required to sustain the polished image of a mega-corporation", as the narrator of the audio accompaniment put it.

On 18 October there was a pair of paintings that Banksy collaborated on with Os Gemeos depicting a single soldier amongst masked citizens and vice versa. "The audio commentary Banksy provided suggests that this piece functions both as situational criticism of the art world as well as a tribute to the Occupy movement. Yet it also recognizes that the installation may be unsuccessful at actually advancing any agenda".

Banksy's second trip to the South Bronx was on 21 October and resulted in a piece depicting a child spray-painting the words "Ghetto 4 Life" on a wall, while a butler waited on him with a platter of spray paints. The work immediately drew a crowd from fans, despite angering many residents, who found the message offensive.

The Sphinx sculpture appeared on a worksite in Willets Point on 22 October, entitled Everything but the kitchen sphinx, and was quickly swarmed by eager Banksy fans. The attention caught the workers interest, who were reportedly selling bricks for $100 each, and onlookers watched as it was loaded into a truck and taken away. The fate of this piece was heavily chronicled by the HBO documentary Banksy Does New York (2014). The piece was taken from its original site, kept in a garage and later appeared in the Art Miami New York modern art fair.

The 23rd installment was cancelled due to police activity, according to Banksy's official website, which stirred rumors that he had come under arrest. That same day, an outlined canvas with the caption "Better Out Than In #AnonymousGuestbook" appeared on a building in Red Hook. The idea of an open-canvas collaborative piece was presented to Banksy two weeks prior by a community art director. The story then led many to believe the "anonymous guestbook" was outlined by Banksy himself, however this was later debunked to have been the work of a group under the name Anonymous Guestbook.

Waiting in Vain was the show's 24th installment. Located outside a strip club in Hell's Kitchen, it illustrated a man in a tuxedo holding flowers, presumably jilted by his date. After some of the club's entertainers posed in front of the piece, the owner had it carefully cut from the shutter gate before vandals could deface it. It is planned to go on permanent display inside the club.

The 25th piece came suitably Halloween-themed. Located on the Bowery, it exhibited a Grim Reaper riding a bumper car in circles to an elaborate light show, fog machine and Blue Öyster Cult's "(Don't Fear) The Reaper." The accompanying audio guide offered a self-mocking interpretation, with Banksy stating that often "the role of art is to remind us of our mortality," implying that with this mounted art show that goes on "for so long we wish we were dead already." The site of the exhibit was once that of an antique shop, some remains of which were placed in a coffin that occupied the lot for months. This prompted other interpretations of the installation's message, paying homage to the "ghosts of Bowry," as the antique store owner suggested.

The 27 October piece was a message on a wall in Greenpoint that read "This site contains blocked messages." It made reference to an unpublished column Banksy had submitted to The New York Times. The controversial essay criticized the city's decision in approving the One World Trade Center, which he described as "vanilla" and looking like "something they would build in Canada." In what became his second reference to the September 11 attacks, Banksy argued the building was a betrayal to everyone who lost their lives that day, and that its blandness is a sign the terrorist won.

The final piece of the month-long series was a group of balloons that together read "BANKSY!", tied to the wall of a building alongside the Long Island Expressway in Queens. Banksy included the message "Save 5pointz" in the caption for the piece on his website, referring to 5 Pointz, a nearby outdoor art exhibit considered to be a focal point of such culture that had recently been approved by the New York City Department of City Planning to be demolished to make way for condominiums.

== Defacement ==
Most of the works that make up the Better Out Than In series were defaced, some just hours after the piece was unveiled. At least one defacement was identified as done by a competing artist, OMAR NYC, who spray-painted over Banksy's red mylar balloon piece in Red Hook. OMAR NYC also defaced some of Banksy's work in May 2010.

As a result of the continued defacement, fans rushed to the sites of the installments as soon as they are announced. A group of men took advantage of this and threatened to deface a stencil painting of a beaver in East New York, charging money for people to take photographs. Some took matters into their own hands by guarding the works, others restoring them once defaced. In part because of the defacement, but also because of the great value of the artworks, property owners have also gone to extreme measures to protect the art. Some hired security guards, others covered the art with acrylic glass, and yet others installed metal roll-down gates.

== Response ==
The month-long show was widely publicized and covered by the media.

Hedge fund manager Nelson Saiers, through his website Heybanksy.com, pledged to donate $100,000 to Hurricane Sandy victims if Banksy created artwork highlighting their ongoing suffering. Although it was unclear whether the artwork was ever created, Saiers went ahead and made the donation regardless.

Mayor Michael Bloomberg, while supporting the arts, criticized Banksy's work, calling him a vandal, contending that defacing property was not his definition of art.

On 17 October the New York Post wrote under the front-page headline "Get Banksy!" that police were pursuing Banksy, but noted the hunt is difficult because he has never been positively identified in public. In response Banksy posted an image of the front page on his website with the caption "I don't read what I believe in the papers." The NYPD later denied they were actively looking for Banksy as no property owners had filed any formal complaints.

=== Controversy ===
Bronx Borough President Rubén Díaz, Jr. called Banksy a "modern-day Picasso" and praised him for choosing to unveil his 16 October Ronald McDonald replica in the South Bronx. This came before Banksy's 21 October piece, which brought discontent to the President and other residents. The piece featured a child spray-painting the words "Ghetto 4 Life" on a wall. Díaz stated it reinforced "outdated negative stereotypes," and defended that Banksy should become aware that graffiti art and culture originated in the Bronx. The owner of the graffitied wall and his partner, however, praised the work and its message, calling it "beautiful" and owning its preservation to the artist's fame.

Banksy's op-ed article about One World Trade Center, posted on his website on 27 October, came as an insult to many across the city. Former FDNY Deputy Chief Jim Riches wrote that it was a "disgrace to New York City and all the families who lost loved ones on 9/11." Sally Regenhard, a leading voice for families of September 11 victims, expressed concerns about Banksy's 15 October depiction of the Twin Towers in TriBeCa, saying the piece was "horrific" and that the placed flower looked more like an explosion. A Century 21 department store near Ground Zero had planned to show Banksy's work on 29 October, but cancelled due to the controversy.

=== Critical reception ===
Banksy's Better Out Than In series has received mixed reviews. Many fans raved over his work, flocking to each site everyday of the show.

New York magazine art critic Jerry Saltz wrote Banksy's well-executed work stood out from other graffiti, but that the meaning behind the pieces aren't as deep as fans like to believe. "No other graffiti artist has a PR machine remotely like Banksy's," he writes, arguing Banksy is more of a "promo man" than an artist.

Will Ellsworth-Jones, author of Banksy: The Man Behind the Wall writes that Better Out Than In shows Banksy's range of mediums has grown to incorporate multi-media and performance-based works. He pointed out the "wonderful commentary on money and art" displayed with hiring an anonymous salesman to sell Banksy paintings in Central Park for $60.

== See also ==
- List of works by Banksy
- Graffiti in New York City
- List of damaged or destroyed works by Banksy
