= Wig (film) =

2019 documentary film directed by Chris Moukarbel

- Film poster
- Directed by: Chris Moukarbel
- Produced by: Chris Moukarbel: Jack Turner; Bruce Cohen; David Burtka; Neil Patrick Harris; Jason Weinberg; Jay Peterson; Michael Mayer; Todd Lubin
- Cinematography: Matthew Klammer
- Edited by: Ezra Paek
- Music by: Patrick Belaga
- Production company: Permanent Wave Productions
- Distributed by: HBO
- Release date: May 4, 2019 (Tribeca Film Festival)
- Running time: 89 minutes

Wig is a 2019 documentary film by Chris Moukarbel about Wigstock, which premiered at the Tribeca Film Festival and later was telecasted on HBO on June 18, 2019.

== Summary ==
Spotlighting the art of drag and centered on the New York staple Wigstock, Wig showcases the personalities and performances that influence the way that people understand queerness, art and identity in today's world. The film juxtaposes present-day footage with archival footage from previous editions of Wigstock and home videos. It charts the journey of drag which has gone from being clandestine to being part of mainstream pop culture.

Lady Bunny and RuPaul performed at the Pyramid Club (New York City) in the 1980s.

Bianca Del Rio and Sherry Vine appeared at the 2018 Wigstock.

Neil Patrick Harris performed Hedwig and the Angry Inch at the 2018 Wigstock.

== Cast ==
- Charlene Incarnate
- Lady Bunny
- Linda Simpson
- Naomi Smalls
- Willam Belli
- Flotilla Debarge
- Lady Quesa'Dilla
- Kevin Aviance
- Neil Patrick Harris
- Matthew Camp

== See also ==
- Wigstock: The Movie
