= Me at the Zoo (2012 film) =

- Promotional release poster
- Directed by: Chris Moukarbel; Valerie Veatch
- Written by: Chris Moukarbel; Valerie Veatch
- Produced by: Chris Moukarbel; Valerie Veatch
- Starring: Cara Cunningham (as Chris Crocker)
- Release date: January 21, 2012 (Sundance)
- Running time: 90 minutes
- Country: United States
- Language: English

Me at the Zoo (stylized as ME @ THE ZOO) is a 2012 documentary film directed by Chris Moukarbel and Valerie Veatch and starring Cara Cunningham, then known as Chris Crocker. Me at the Zoo takes a look at the young video blogger from a small town in Tennessee. The documentary delves into the life of Cunningham, who was made famous on the internet through numerous public videos, notably her video "Leave Britney Alone", which garnered mainstream media attention. The film also explores how video sharing and social media have shaped the way people share their stories and go about their lives. On January 17, 2012, HBO Documentary Films secured the US broadcasting rights to the film. It premiered at the 2012 Sundance Film Festival on January 21, 2012, and on HBO on June 25, 2012.
