= Valerie Veatch =

American film director

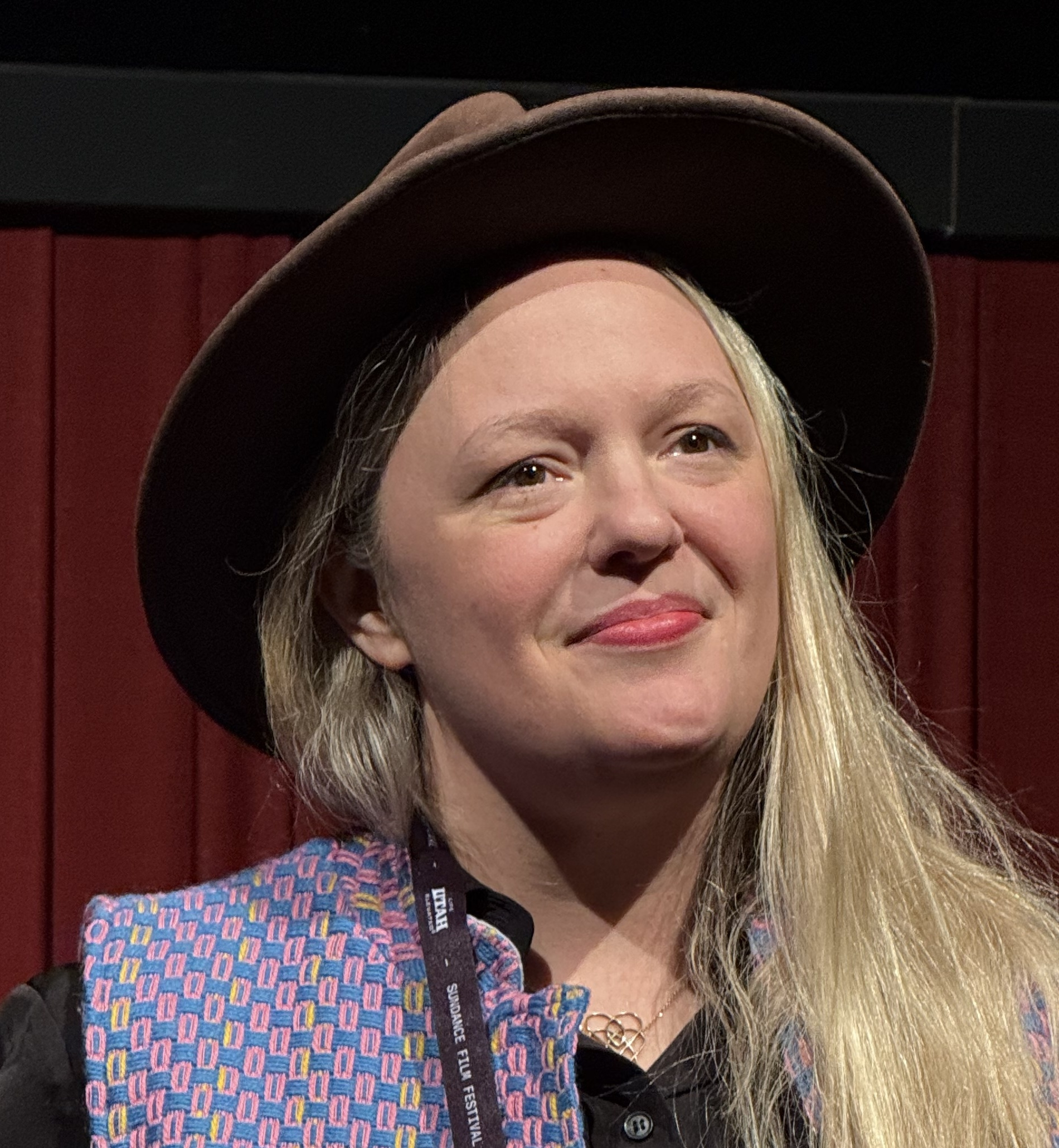
- Born: 13 April 1985 (age 41); Seattle
- Education: The New School
- Occupations: Film director, screenwriter, film editor, film producer

Valerie Veatch is an American filmmaker.

She is a graduate of the New School.

== Filmography ==
- Ghost in the Machine (2026)
- Love Child (2014)
- Me at the Zoo (2012)
- Revolution in Three Acts (2006)
