= Wigstock =

Annual outdoor drag festival in Manhattan

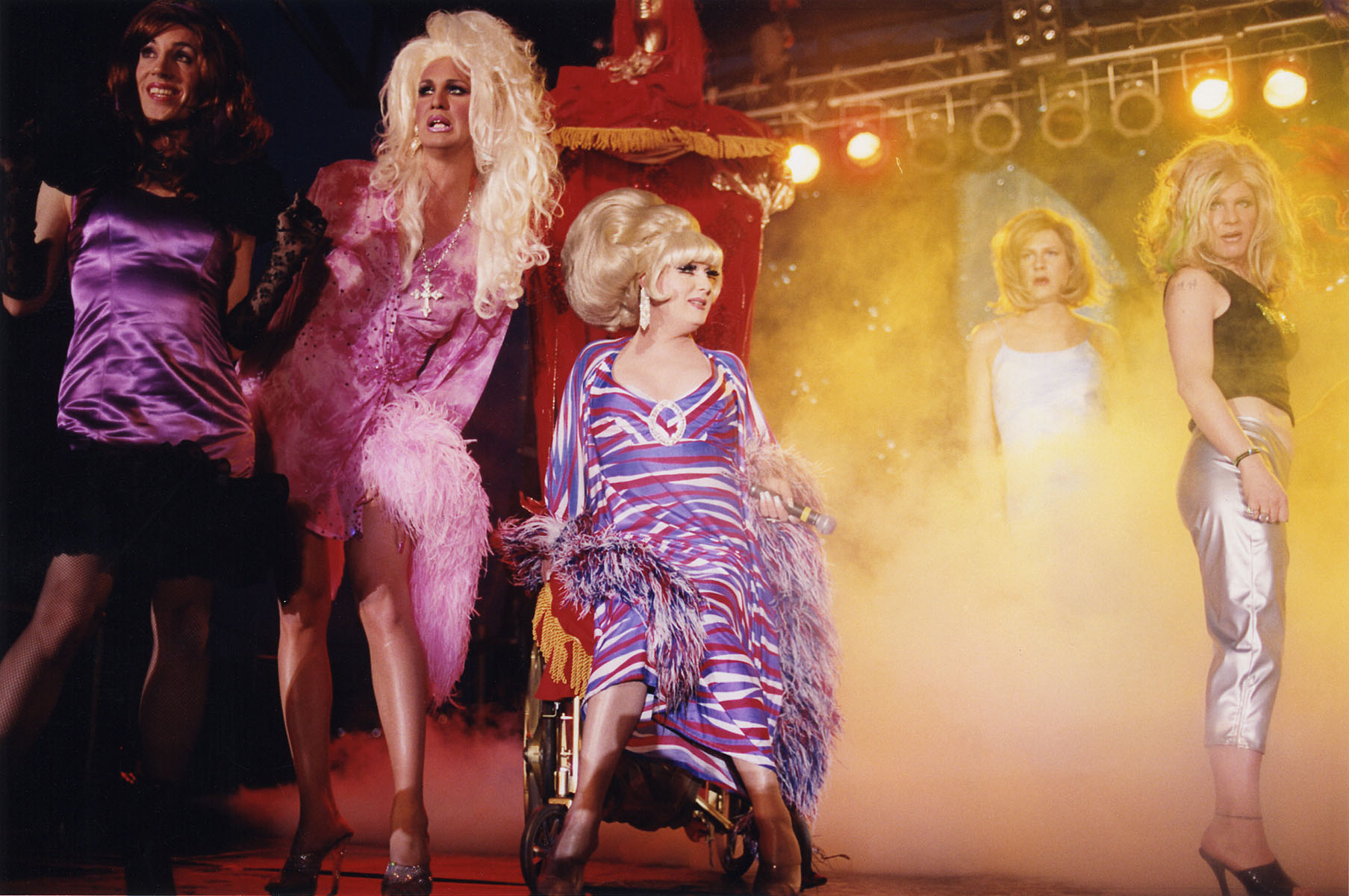
- Lady Bunny and other performers during Wigstock 2000 at Pier 54, New York City
- Inaugurated: 1984
- Founder: Lady Bunny

Wigstock is an outdoor drag festival that began annually in 1984 in Manhattan's East Village that took place on Labor Day. Continuing, with a few gaps, until 2005, the festival would traditionally act as the unofficial end to the summer for the gay community of New York City. After a 12-year gap, the festival was revived by Lady Bunny and Neil Patrick Harris on September 1, 2018 at Pier 17 of the South Street Seaport in Lower Manhattan. The Covid-19 pandemic then forced the festival to go into hiatus, and since then the event has been revived but no longer on a reliably annual basis. The name is a parody upon the 1969 Woodstock Festival.

== History ==
Hosted by co-creator Lady Bunny, the festival was held in its first years in Tompkins Square Park in Alphabet City, Lower Manhattan. According to Lady Bunny, the event began spontaneously in 1984 after a group of drag queens (along with Wendy Wild, NYC artist Scott Lifshutz and a couple of Fleshtones) became inebriated at the nearby Pyramid Club and decided to put on a show in the park.

In the mid-1990s, the Giuliani administration prohibited the festival from being held in Tompkins Square and Union Square, and moved it to the Hudson River, effectively ensuring it would lose its grassroots activist appeal. Lady Bunny said that 2001's Wigstock would be the last, but in 2003, 2004, and 2005, Wigstock and Bunny returned to Tompkins Square, this time under the auspices of the Howl Festival.

== Documentaries ==
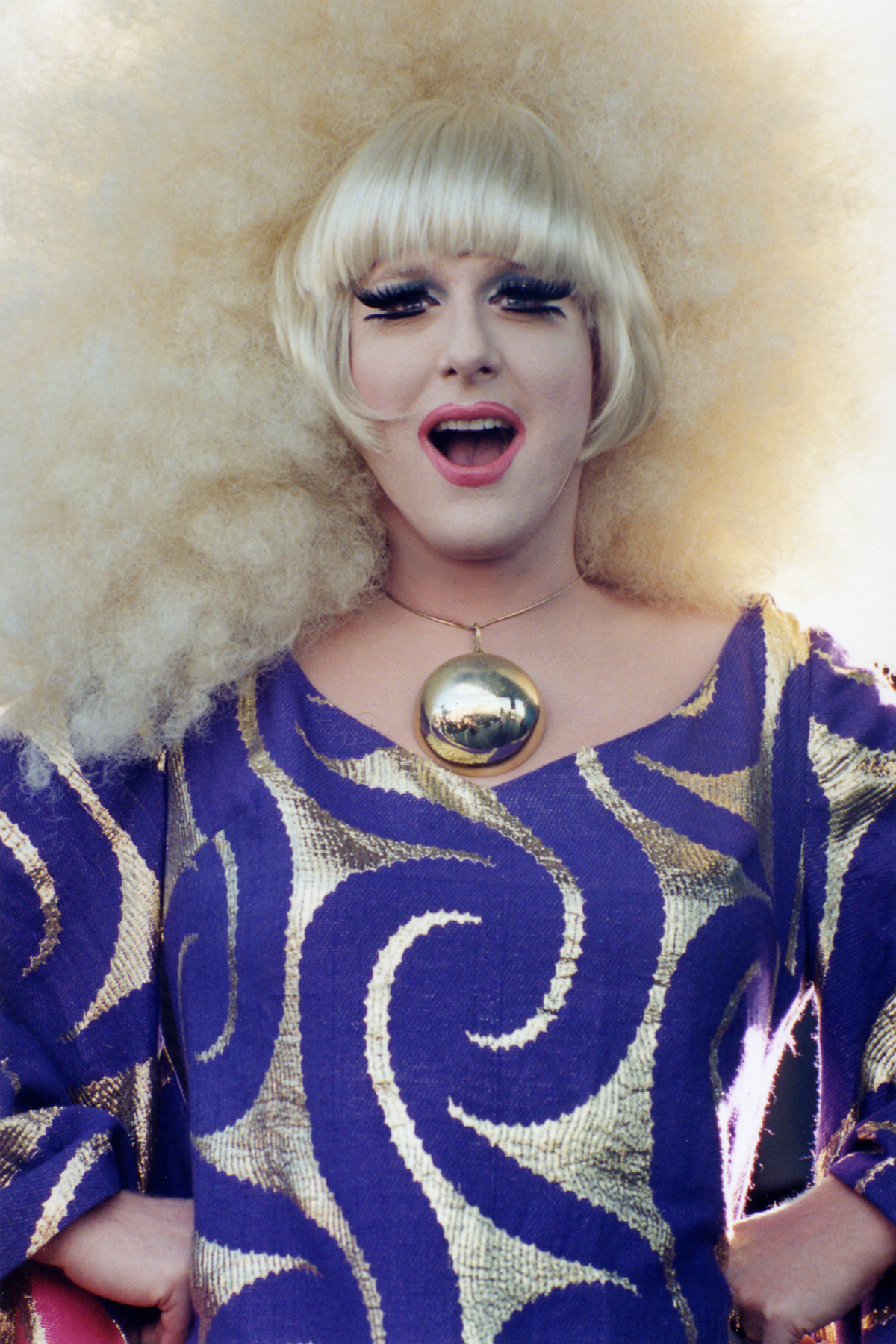
Lady Bunny, Wigstock 2001, Pier 54, NYC.

In 1987, video artist Tom Rubnitz filmed a 20-minute documentary titled Wigstock: The Movie. Rubnitz's film captures the event's early improvised atmosphere; early years of Wigstock often made direct reference to Woodstock (including performance artist John Kelly's send-up of Joni Mitchell and her song "Woodstock"), and Rubnitz's film mimics aspects of the 1970 Woodstock concert film.

A second documentary titled Wigstock: The Movie was released in 1995; the festivals captured are larger and more polished, with rock music largely supplanted by house music, and the influence of the original Woodstock festival less evident. The 1995 film gained a wider audience and was distributed across the country, then released on video and DVD.

The 2019 film Wig by Chris Moukarbel explores the festival's origins, evolution, and its 2018 reincarnation.

== See also ==
- Drag culture in New York City
- LGBTQ culture in New York City
- List of LGBTQ people from New York City
- NYC Drag March
- NYC Pride March
- RuPaul's DragCon NYC
- Transgender culture in New York City
