= Daddy's Boys =

Daddy's Boys is a 1988 American film. The film was directed by Joseph Minion, and the screenplay was written by Daryl Haney.

== Cast ==
- Daryl Haney as Jimmy
- Laura Burkett as Christie
- Raymond J Barry as Daddy
- Dan Shor as Hawk
- Christian Clemenson as Otis
- Ellen Gerstein as Henrietta; Madame Wang
- Robert V Barron as Axelrod
- Paul Linke as Traveling Salesman
- John Voldstad as Motorist
- Hinton Battle as Piano Player
- Jessica Nelson as Waitress
- Jonathan Emerson as Receptionist

== Production ==
Roger Corman later wrote in his memoirs he was feeling frustrated by spending too much of his time on bookkeeping and contracts. He was nostalgic for the days when he would make films over a very short period of time using standing sets from other movies, such as The Terror and Little Shop of Horrors. He was filming Big Bad Mama II and decided to finance a film using that film's sets. He wanted to do a gangster film called Mama's Boys and offered it to Joseph Minion who had written After Hours. Minion's fee was only $5,000, but Corman guaranteed he would be filming within ten days.

Minion wrote the script with Daryl Haney who also starred. They turned the film into a male story, and renamed it Daddy's Boys. Corman estimated the budget at $300,000 and said it made a small profit after being released theatrically in Europe and on video in the US.
