= Banksy Does New York =

- Film poster
- Directed by: Chris Moukarbel
- Release date: October 11, 2014 (Hamptons)

Banksy Does New York is a 2014 HBO documentary film directed by Chris Moukarbel about Banksy's Better Out Than In project. The documentary covers Banksy's one month residency in October 2013, in which the artist presented a new work of art daily and announced the locations via his Instagram account each morning.

Among the artworks filmed and described are a cement sphinx, a truck of moving puppet farm animals driven and parked in front of various New York butchers and meat markets, paintings which were sold for a day in Central Park for $60 each which were then estimated to be worth hundreds of thousands of dollars, and the Banality of the Banality of Evil, which portrays a man dressed as a Nazi peacefully sitting and looking out over an already existing landscape from—and then donated back to—a charitable thrift shop.
