= Pridelines =

American LGBTQ nonprofit organization

Pridelines is a 501c(3) nonprofit organization based in Miami, Florida, that serves as Miami - Dade County only LGBTQAI+ community center offering comprehensive services throughout the County. Pridelines headquarters is located in Liberty City and has satellite locations in Miami Beach and Cutler Bay. The organization has announced the opening of a housing facility in Overtown section of Miami. Pridelines provides a variety of human services including a safe space for the LGBTQ+ community, housing, case management, mental health counseling, a clothing closet, showers, food pantry and daily hot meals, a clinic that includes providing the community with PrEP/PEP/ARV medications and more.

== History ==
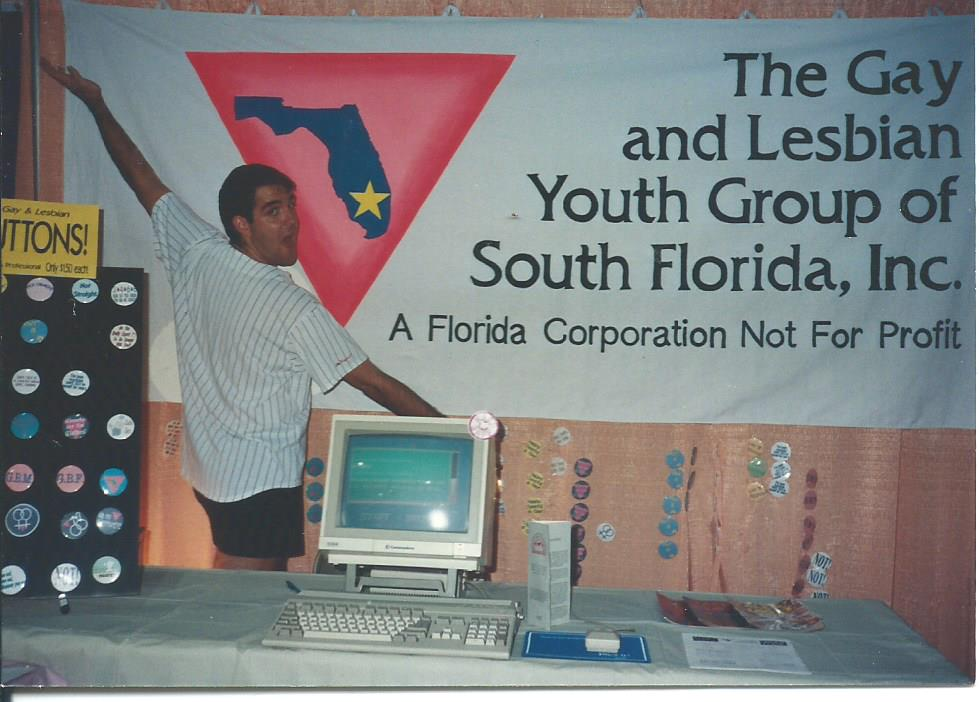

Pridelines was created in 1982 in the wake of Anita Bryant's Save Our Children anti gay rights crusade by a group of students from Miami Dade Community College and several Dade County high schools with support from Marilyn Volker, head of MDCC's Institute on Sexism and Sexuality . The group, originally named The Gay and Lesbian Youth Group of South Florida was incorporated by founding member Paul Lynch as a 501(c)(3) nonprofit organization on June 1, 1990. The organization provided a peer-facilitate/adult assisted support group where youth could discuss the difficulties they faced regarding sexual identity and were given the tools to face those challenges. In 1996, the group was renamed Pridelines Youth services, Inc. to better represent the growth of the organization and its focus on being a supportive environment for those seeking to understand queer identities.

In response to the HIV/AIDS crisis, Pridelines Youth Services, Inc. recognized its role in supporting and elevating community and begin to test community members for the virus. In 2024, Pridelines announced that it would not only test for HIV/AIDS/STIs but it would expand its services to include treatment, prevention, and providing community members with free health insurance.

Over the years, the organization has received public support from Miami - Dade County, the city of Miami, and the city of Miami Beach. The city of Miami awarded the organization $50,000 to support its efforts. Pridelines was recently noted as an important organization to support during Pride Month.
