= Chris Moukarbel =

American director and producer

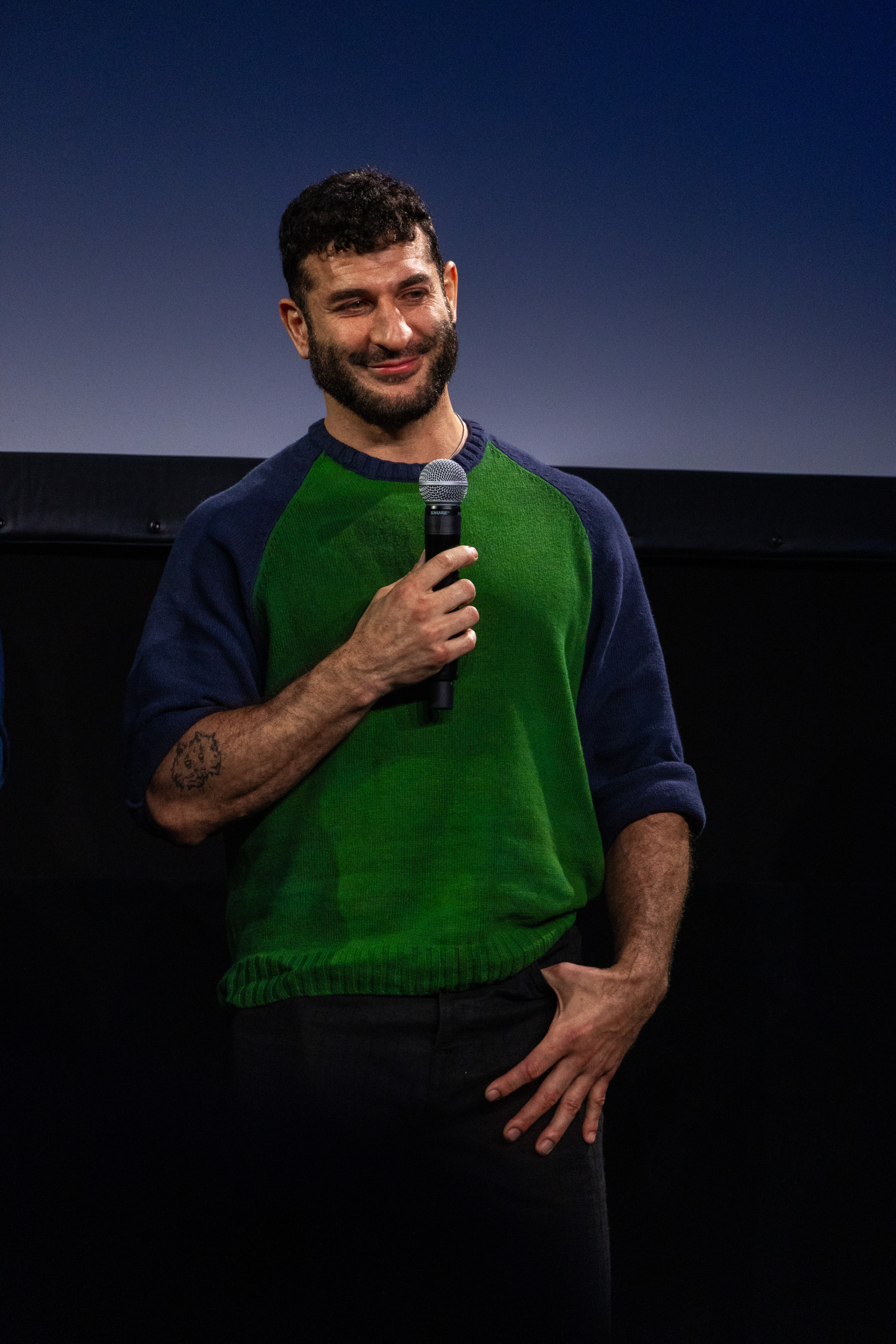
Moukarbel in 2025

Chris Moukarbel is an American film director, writer, producer, and contemporary artist, who runs the production company Permanent Wave Productions.

== Film career ==
His first feature documentary Me at the Zoo premiered in competition at Sundance Film Festival in 2012 and was acquired by HBO Documentaries. The film charts the rise of YouTube and tells the story of an early viral Internet celebrity, Chris Crocker of “Leave Britney Alone!” fame. Moukarbel was approached by Sheila Nevins to direct the documentary Banksy Does New York for HBO.

He is also the creator and director of the HBO series Sex On // which takes a look at sex and relationships in the Information age. It was conceived as a reboot of the classic show Real Sex. His work often explores technology and identity.

Moukarbel directed and produced the film Gaga: Five Foot Two. It premiered at the 2017 Toronto Film Festival and was acquired by Netflix. His documentary Wig explores the New York City drag queen scene and the drag festival Wigstock. It premiered at the Tribeca Film Festival on May 4, 2019, and premiered on June 18 on HBO. His first narrative feature film Cypher premiered at the 2023 Tribeca Film Festival where it won the award for best U.S. Narrative Feature. The screenplay for Cypher was later collected by The Academy of Motion Picture Arts and Sciences Library.

Moukarbel produced the HBO film Slave Play. Not a Movie. A Play. through his company Permanent Wave Productions. Moukarbel premiered his film The Honey Trap on Dec 6, 2024 on Paramount+. In August 2025 Moukarbel signed a first look deal between his company and Madrid-based Secuoya Studios.

== Artwork ==
Moukarbel made art videos and contemporary art while living in New York. His best known video art project World Trade Center was made as part of his graduate school thesis at Yale School of Art. Moukarbel acquired a bootleg script for a then upcoming Oliver Stone film World Trade Center and he shot his own version using student actors. The short film was released freely on the internet as a way to pre-empt the Stone film and caused a highly publicized lawsuit by Paramount Pictures.

In a New York Times article about the art project, Moukarbel said in the interview "My film was offered free on the Internet… It cost $1,000 to produce. We're at a place now where technology allows the democratization of storytelling. Through their access and budget they're able to affect a lot of people's ideas about an event and also affect policy. I was deliberately using their script and pre-empting their release to make a statement about power." After Paramount blocked the distribution of the video it continued to be shown at Witte de With Institute of Contemporary art who refused to comply with the court order.

His artwork has shown at Marianne Boesky Gallery, Air de Paris, Witte de with and Wallspace gallery among others.

== Music videos ==
Moukarbel co-directed the REM music video Everyday is Yours to Win, The Drums, I Felt Stupid and Joan as Police Woman's Start of my Heart.

== Accolades ==
Award	Year	Category	Nominee(s)	Result
2018 MTV Movie & TV Awards	2018	Best Music Documentary	Gaga: Five Foot Two	Won
2015 News & Documentary Emmy Awards	2015	Outstanding Arts and Cultural Programming	Banksy Does New York	Nominated
2023 Tribeca Film Festival	2023	Best U.S. Narrative Feature	Cypher	Won

== Personal life ==
Moukarbel was born in New Haven, Connecticut, to Lebanese parents and lives between Los Angeles and New York. He attended Corcoran School of Art and Yale School of Art. Chris Moukarbel was in a relationship with Jake Shears, the frontman of the band Scissor Sisters from 2004 to 2015.
