= Cara Cunningham =

American Internet personality and recording artist

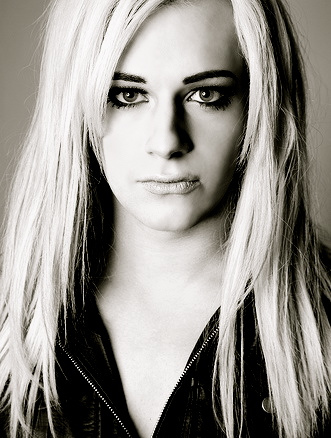
- Cunningham in 2009
- Born: December 7, 1987 (age 38); Bristol, Tennessee, U.S.
- Other name: Chris Crocker
- Years active: 2006–present
- Known for: Comedy; performance art; recording artist; LGBTQ+ and youth issues

Cara Cunningham (formerly Chris Crocker; born December 7, 1987) is an American internet personality, recording artist, YouTuber, and former pornographic film actress. As of October 2010, Cunningham's videos had received a combined 50 million plays on MySpace, and her vlog channel on YouTube was the 100th-most viewed of all time in all categories, with over 205 million video views, before Cunningham closed her YouTube account in September 2015. Her work consists mainly of short-form, self-directed monologues shot in her grandparents' home.

Cunningham gained fame in September 2007 from her viral video "Leave Britney Alone!", in which she tearfully defended pop singer Britney Spears' comeback performance at the MTV Video Music Awards; the video received over four million views in two days. The video gained international media attention, hundreds of parodies, and criticism for Cunningham, which included accusations of narcissism, melodrama, and histrionics, and using Spears' personal shortcomings to bolster her own fame. Others have accused Cunningham of acting in the "Leave Britney Alone!" video, although Cunningham insisted it was genuine on a September 2007 appearance on Maury Povich's Maury show. Cunningham produces and acts in her own videos, and is a self-described edutainer.

In most of Cunningham's early works, she presents herself as an openly gender non-conforming person and effeminate Southerner in a "small-minded town" in the Bible Belt. During her teenage years, Cunningham used "Crocker" as a stage name in order to keep her identity and location secret, due to death threats she received. In 2014, Queerty stated that with thousands of Facebook and Twitter followers, Cunningham is "one of those self-invented social media icons".

== Early life ==
Cunningham was born Christopher Cunningham in East Tennessee to a teenage couple and was raised by her grandparents. Cunningham said she "raised eyebrows" by bringing Barbie dolls to kindergarten for show and tell rather than the toys or action figures more conventionally associated with boys. Cunningham continued to live in Tennessee throughout her youth, and was homeschooled in response to constant "death threats, bullying and glares at her clothes and makeup" specifically after reportedly being "harassed by a homophobic high school gym coach". Cunningham lived with her fundamentalist Pentecostal grandparents who continued raising her when her teenage parents were not able. While her grandfather reportedly knows little about her Internet fame, her grandmother has reluctantly appeared in some of her videos.

== Internet career ==
Cunningham is best known for her Britney Spears video, uploaded to YouTube on September 10, 2007. The first part of the infamous work was posted September 9, 2007, called "Leave Britney Alone pt.1" to her MySpace page, while the better-known "LEAVE BRITNEY ALONE!" (part 2) was posted to both Myspace and YouTube. In "Leave Britney Alone pt.1", an emotional Cunningham stated that she did not want fellow Southerner Britney Spears to spiral out of control like Anna Nicole Smith, who had died in February 2007. As of November 2010, the video had been viewed over 35 million times and had accumulated a total of over 500,000 comments. It is just a few seconds shorter than the second part, and Cunningham, although emotional, remains relatively calm and composed, becoming teary only at the very end.

In the videos, Cunningham condemns gossip columnists such as Perez Hilton and reality TV star Simon Cowell who criticized Britney Spears' onstage music performance at the 2007 MTV Video Music Awards in Las Vegas. Within the first 24 hours of its posting, the video had accumulated over 2 million views. As of January 2009, it had accumulated a total of 24 million views and was the second-most discussed video of all time on the site (in all categories), with over 350,000 comments. "LEAVE BRITNEY ALONE!" was one of YouTube's fastest "climbing" videos, reaching the minimum seven million views needed (as of September 2007) to be included in the "Top 100". The video was nominated in the Commentary category in the 2007 YouTube Awards. The video received worldwide attention and earned Cunningham interviews on CNN, Fox News, MSNBC, The Today Show, Maury, The Howard Stern Show, Jimmy Kimmel Live! and Ryan Seacrest's KIIS-FM morning show. Cunningham and her video were also commented upon in the mainstream media by shows like The View and The Tonight Show with Jay Leno. YouTube said "the melodramatic two-minute clip made [Cunningham] an instant YouTube star" and named it one of the top videos of 2007. Wired magazine named it the top video of 2007.

Due to the attention from her September 2007 Leave Britney Alone! video, Cunningham was seen as a viral video sensation and was asked by MTV vlogger and news staffer Matt Sunbulli to provide video for MTV's website which also broadcasts on MTV itself. Cunningham indicated that she hoped to develop her acting career; she agreed to develop ideas for a TV show with Los Angeles producer Glenn Meehan and met with representatives from MTV's gay-themed channel LOGO. According to Variety, Cunningham signed a development deal with 44 Blue Productions to create a "docusoap" reality television show, which would be called Chris Crocker's 15 Minutes More. Rasha Drachkovitch, the production company's co-founder, stated, "It's going to pretty much be the Chris Crocker experience. We consider [her] a rebel character that people will find interesting. [She's] going to be a TV star."

Although sometimes shown in conjunction with news footage of Spears' performance, the "pure performance art" video became its own story, with the news media and the gossip industry offering opinions on the phenomenon, joking that Cunningham could be "an insidious satiric mastermind" and comparing her to Andy Kaufman. In the video, Cunningham proclaims, "All you people care about is readers and making money off of her. She's a human! Leave Britney alone!" Cunningham stated that although she is often acting in her videos, her emotions were genuine and "straight from the heart"; although she described the clip as a "second take" in one interview, she clarified on Jimmy Kimmel Live! that she meant that it was the second part of a longer video, the first part being "Leave Britney Alone pt. 1".

The "Leave Britney Alone!" video became a satire target, with parody videos, references in mainstream television spoofs, and films. Actor Seth Green's parody, which included him applying eyeliner several times and promoting his show Robot Chicken, called for people to "leave Chris Crocker alone!" Some video responses characterized Cunningham as a drama queen, and Wired magazine stated that the video "sent world Schadenfreude levels zooming to heights unseen since the Fatty Arbuckle scandal." The January 2008 parody film Meet the Spartans used pop culture references and met with generally poor reviews; the Electronic Urban Report called Cunningham's cameo the "film's funniest moment". Both Cunningham and the video were also parodied in the South Park episode "Canada on Strike", with a cartoon Cunningham running around in a fight between various Internet memes, telling them to "leave the others alone". In March 2008, a trance remix dance single "Leave Britney Alone" was released on iTunes and other sites by "Double J" featuring quotes from Cunningham's video.

While numerous news and media outlets reported on the viral video, Fox News Channel's morning program Fox & Friends commentators questioned Cunningham's gender and compared the fabric backdrop in the video to Osama bin Laden's videos. Cunningham produced two response videos – Poor FOX "News".. and Rosie O'Donnell was right about FOX "News" (originally posted as "Dear Fox 'News'") – addressing what she characterized as biased treatment while she called Fox News the "Republican, conservative, homophobic channel". Cunningham's stated concerns were the commentators calling her a "she/he" and what she felt was needless questioning of her gender instead of commenting on the content of the video. Cunningham deactivated her YouTube channel in 2015. In March 2016, Cunningham interviewed for Contrast Magazine and opened up about why she deleted her YouTube channel.

In February 2021, Cunningham created an OnlyFans account. In the same month, following the release of the New York Times documentary Framing Britney Spears led to broader public reconsideration of how media treated Spears in 2007, Cunningham released a statement on Instagram framing her experience as a teachable moment. She described the backlash she faced as a visibly genderbending teenager for expressing the same then-unpopular opinion as straight media critics such as Michael Moore as transphobic. She also said that she was verbally and physically assaulted by members of the LGBT community for making them look bad in the media. Cunningham said that the backlash made her fear for her life as a gay teenager without much money living in the South.

== Other ventures ==
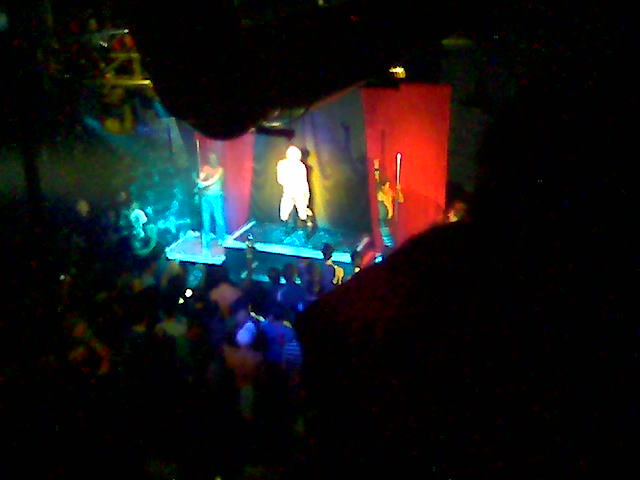
Cunningham performing with back-up dancers at gay disco club Ice in Hamtramck, Michigan, in October 2007

Cunningham has been involved in various projects. In a June 2007 autobiographical comic strip, where she discusses future plans, she states, "I'm going to make the leap from living with my Pentecostal grandparents to living with drag queen roommates. I'm going to star in my own TV show. I'm going to make the leap from outhouses to bathhouses...to my very own house." In October 2007, Cunningham opened Fox Reality channel's "Reality Remix Really Awards". Cunningham was one of Lily Allen's Internet correspondents on the February 2008 premiere episode of BBC's Lily Allen and Friends where she posed questions for the guest celebrities, in this case David Mitchell and later, Cuba Gooding, Jr. On May 23, 2008, rock band Weezer released a viral music video for their song "Pork and Beans" – "a natural anthem for the self-expression that's been taking shape on YouTube" – which featured various mash-ups of viral videos and YouTube celebrities, including Cunningham, all playing themselves. On May 22, 2009, Cunningham made a video showing a Grammy plaque that she received for her contribution to the band's video. On July 9, 2009, Cunningham appeared on the Comedy Central show Tosh.0.

Cunningham released her first single, "Mind in the Gutter", in 2008. She released her first EP titled The First Bite digitally on iTunes March 19, 2011. "I Want Your Bite" was then released as the second single. Later that year, Cunningham released the songs "Second to None", "Tug of War", and "Taking My Life Back". In 2012, Cunningham released the songs "Locked Up Lovers" and "Lucky Tonight". Cunningham's second EP, Walls Down, was released on March 14, 2013, under her new stage name Chris Cunningham-Crocker. The EP is a departure of her previous dance style, mainly consisting of ballads and features a duet with her mother. The first single from the EP, "Breaking Up", was released on January 24, 2013. Cunningham announced in August 2011 that a film documenting her life over the past few years would be released, titled Me at the Zoo. The film also explores how video sharing and social media have shaped the way people share her stories and go about her lives. On January 17, 2012, HBO Documentary Films secured the US broadcasting rights to the film. It premiered at the 2012 Sundance Film Festival on January 21, 2012 and on HBO on June 25, 2012.

In July 2011, it was announced that Cunningham had been signed by Chi Chi LaRue to appear in a pornographic film. She made her adult film debut in October 2012 for Maverick Men. In 2014, Lucas Entertainment digitally released Chris Crocker's Raw Love, which features Cunningham in a scene with her then-boyfriend Justin Dean. Cunningham stated that acting in porn was going to be more than a single event; "it was going to be the porn and then a website, with the same companies." She said she was focused on setting up a future with her then-boyfriend and getting a house and a mortgage. "I said, 'Well if I'm going to do it, then let's make it worth it.' So, then we broke up a week before the porn came out. So then, yeah, it kind of ended." She added, "You have to contractually, and things, promote a porn. So I regret doing it with my ex more than I regret doing it in general." She said she could do porn again, but wondered how she would extend that into a viable career. "[W]here is the reality show? And where are the people that have seen how interesting my life is? Not that many people were, like, the first of their kind to be an Internet celebrity—what happens after that?" she said. "What happens after you extend your 15 minutes of fame to 30 minutes of fame, and it's six, seven years later, and you're still living at home in Tennessee? I think that's an interesting story, a little more than Honey Boo Boo."

== Personal life ==
=== Appearance, transition and gender identity ===
Following her mainstream success, Cunningham gradually began to change her image from feminine to masculine, eventually adopting a predominantly masculine appearance by 2012. Cunningham said that although she understands she is more socially or traditionally attractive, she dislikes people saying it and "the most irritating thing" is when men that she finds attractive say that they find her more attractive this way. She felt that people should accept all of her instead of only the masculine side, and that dating is difficult because "[the guys] can't always accept that [she] used to dress up or that that's a part of [her] still and that [she still dresses up]." She identifies with the acceptance that she received from her grandmother, who always wanted her to present as masculine, but she also finds it upsetting because she did not accept the way Cunningham was before.

Cunningham previously said that her gender was an amalgam: "I started gradually. I was wearing less makeup and pushing my hair back and putting it in a pony tail instead of curling it or wearing it long." She stated that she "never realize[s] the changes that are taking place. They literally just happen" and that "[her] hair extensions got shorter and shorter and [she] went from 26-inch extensions to shoulder-length extensions." She said that the process was the same with regard to "dressing like a girl," adding, "It's little by little." With regard to the gender she was more comfortable as, Cunningham stated, "I definitely feel the most connected with myself I've ever felt. Maybe that's because before I began to explore my more masculine traits, I thought I was going to go through with a boob job." Cunningham said she had now "explored both sides" and felt she knew herself well.

Cunningham has expressed discontent with the LGBT community not understanding her genderbending and accompanying gender expression or gender identity: "I can understand straight people being confused but within the gay community? The gay on gay hatred or the gay on gay discrimination is what I find so puzzling." She said "when other queer people say, 'If you were really transsexual...' – because I lived as a girl for three years and people ask, 'Was that all an act?' That's the biggest thing that I get disgusted by." Cunningham said if it were all an act, she would not have gone through the trouble for three years: for example, using women's bathrooms and having trouble in airports. Cunningham said she thought the whole point of being transgender is being what you feel on the inside. "For me, I wonder why do you have to just feel like a woman trapped in a man's body? Or vice versa? Why can't you identify with both genders and tap into those without being accused of dressing up as a girl for attention?" Cunningham feels that she was "fulfilling whatever vibe [she wants] to go with at that time." She "[tries] to block out people's voices in [her] head and just go with how [she feels]." She acknowledged, however, that her masculine look being "easier on [her] family and society" factored into her presenting as masculine.

In a Queerty February 2014 interview, Cunningham stated that she was reconsidering whether or not to transition to a female gender identity. "I think I'm getting tired of that chameleon lifestyle," she stated. "Like I said, I know I would be 100 percent happy living as a girl. But it's a lot of work, and it's a lot of therapy you have to go through. And I'm willing to put in that work." She added, "Some people get a haircut. I change genders or gender aesthetics. I don't know that I'll ever be content just one way or another." Cunningham said that she is on a journey when assessing that part of her life, and that she would not mind completely transitioning. She said that while living as an "everyday guy", she wanted to see if she liked the experience, but that she was unhappy living that way and it did not work because that is not who she is.

In August 2021, Cunningham came out as transgender and changed her first name to Cara. She also said she would be beginning feminizing hormone therapy.

=== Onch promotional deal and lawsuit ===
In October 2007, TMZ reported that Cunningham was being sued by Onch Movement Jewelry for $1 million for fraud and breach of contract, and provided a copy of the civil complaint filed in Los Angeles. Jewelry designer Nelson Chung, professionally known as Onch and a fan of Cunningham, hired her as a celebrity spokesmodel for more than two days' worth of publicity work as well as appearance at World of Wonder's Just Britney art show in exchange for airfare. It was speculated by DMW Media that Cunningham had no legal representative as the agreement seemed unbalanced. Cunningham did make appearances including at gay club Rage and the art show where she was interviewed by MTV showing artwork of her in homage to Spears. Onch's YouTube channel also posted videos of appearances which were later removed.

=== Relationships ===
Cunningham announced her engagement in January 2025, but later called it off.

=== Politics ===
Although she was previously against President Donald Trump, Cunningham announced support for him in 2024, citing his anti-establishment views, political correctness, and culture wars, among other factors.

== Image and style ==
Cunningham's uncensored vlogging has been attributed to her isolation as an "effeminate, Southern, flamboyantly gay" adolescent in a "small-minded town" in the Bible Belt." Her sexual orientation and outspokenness have been described as a "subtext... rarely addressed directly and never completely accepted" in her hometown. According to Cunningham, when her grandmother found out that she was gay, she initially "said that [he] needed an exorcism". Cunningham has further commented on her town's lack of gay culture, saying, "The only gay pride parade where I live is in my bedroom" as she held up a rainbow frosted cupcake. She added, "We don't have pride and rainbows here. We have MySpace. We don't have bathhouses, we have outhouses." Communications lecturer Michael Strangelove described Cunningham as a trailblazer for vloggers, especially LGBTQ vloggers, being genuine and campy while criticizing popular culture.

Cunningham's earliest experience with online networking was as an editor of an e-zine, where she met her first boyfriend, with whom she was only able to interact online and by phone. Cunningham later found another online forum, where her acting skills helped her blend in on a free phone party line run out of Los Angeles "filled with flaming black men, black drag queens, and [transgender people] from Compton", where she was outed as white and dubbed "cracker". In June 2006, Cunningham began uploading self-produced videos, characterized as her "singularly bizarre and angry take on gay life and [her] intolerant town".

Although her video defending Britney Spears drew the attention of the wider public, Cunningham had already become one of the most-watched video producers on MySpace and YouTube, having gathered what MSNBC described as a "cult following". Prior to Cunningham's defense of Spears, some of the more than sixty videos she had posted to the two social networking websites had already been viewed more than a million times each, and her YouTube channel was in the top rankings. Some of the videos were only posted on one site or the other, many becoming "viral video hits".

In May 2007, Cunningham was the subject of a lengthy profile in the Seattle alternative weekly The Stranger, which discussed her Internet fame prior to the "Leave Britney Alone!" video, and the adversities she has faced. Dave Schlenker of the newspaper considered her videos to be bold and seething "flares sent up by a young gay man marooned in a sea of rednecks" who is stuck in a small town that "can't tolerate homosexuality and punishes flamboyance." He stated that Cunningham's videos include "sex-filled confessions" and "wild monologues" talking "about everything from AIDS to pubic hair." In many of the videos, Cunningham portrays characters, such as an older deeply religious woman in "The Earl Annie Edna show" series and exaggerated comic characterizations of Southern stereotypes.

Cunningham believes that the Leave Britney Alone! video and performing in porn have hurt her chances of pursuing an acting career. "A lot of people think the Britney video is what got me famous and what gave me all these opportunities, but if I were to have gone to L.A. as an unknown actor—I probably could have gotten a lot more work." She said, "I don't regret it necessarily; I think it just gives me more hurdles to overcome... Which, you know... and obviously doing the porn thing didn't necessarily help me." Cunningham described the porn aspect as having tarnished things, but said that it is up to her "to make those little calculated moves". "It kind of created a whole other box that I have to overcome," she stated. "But when you're known as the Britney-boy, or you're in a '15 minutes of fame' box, it's very interesting, because the offers start coming at you really quick. And when they dwindle, you don't know what to do."
