= LaLaPaRUza =

Episode of RuPaul's Drag Race All Stars

- RuPaul's Drag Race All Stars episode
- Episode no.: Season 4 Series 6 Episode 6
- Original air date: January 18, 2019

Episode chronology
← Previous "Roast in Peace"	Next → "Queens of Clubs"
- RuPaul's Drag Race All Stars season 4

"LaLaPaRUza" is the sixth episode of the fourth season of the American television series RuPaul's Drag Race All Stars. It originally aired on January 18, 2019. The episode's main challenge tasks the remaining contestants with competing against the eliminated contestants in a series of lip-sync contests. Latrice Royale returns to the competition after she and Monique Heart are both declared winners of the final contest.

== Episode ==
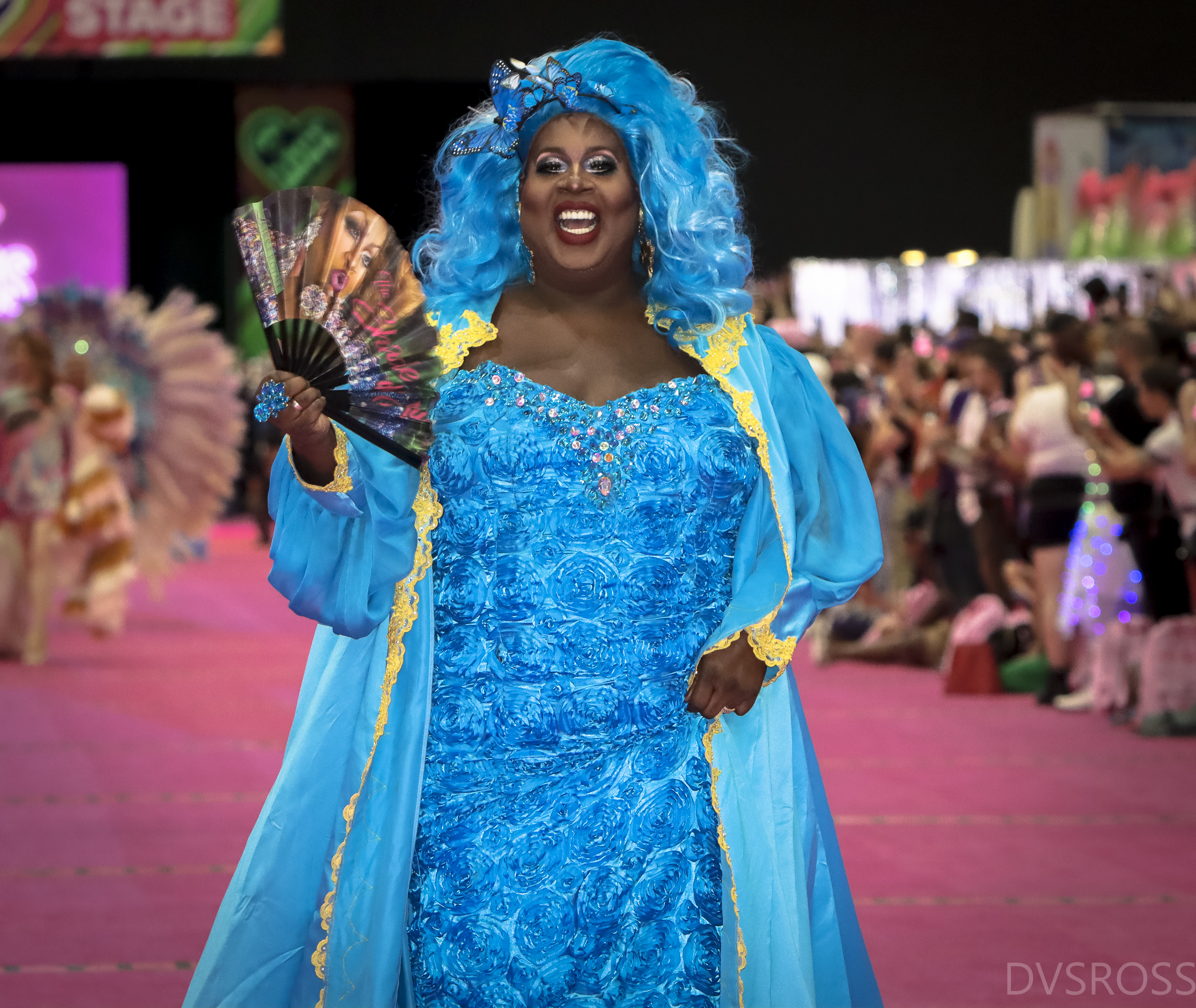
The episode sees Latrice Royale (pictured in 2022) return to the competition.

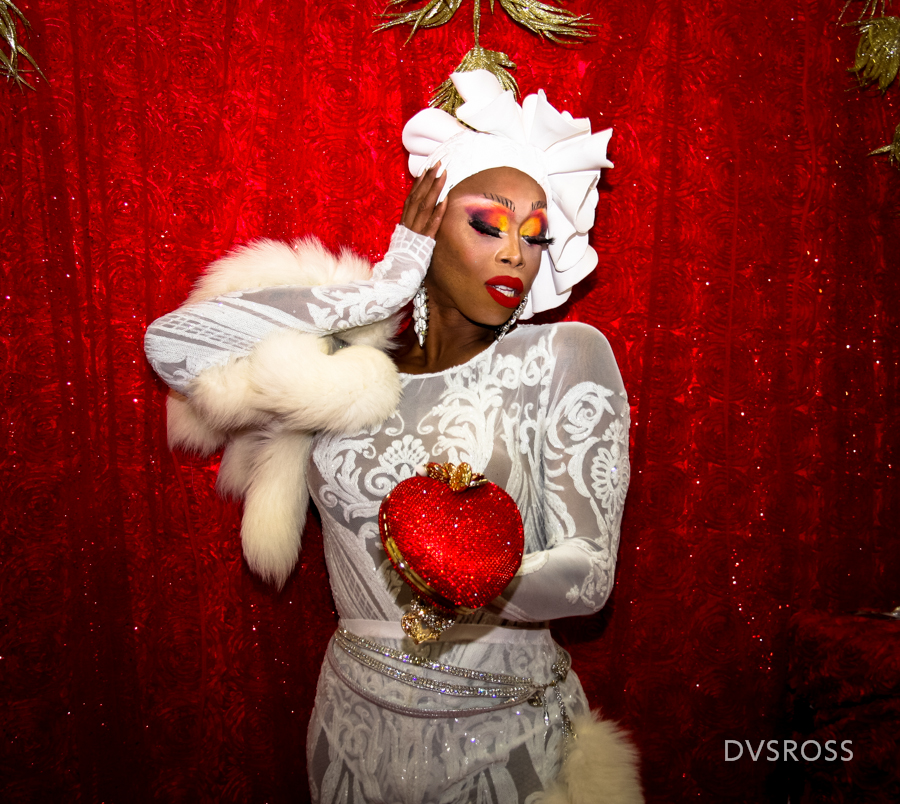
Monique Heart (pictured in 2018) is also declared a winner of the final lip-sync contest.

The remaining and eliminated contestants meet in the workroom. Farrah Moan shares that RuPaul has invited the eliminated contestants back for a chance to return to the competition. Manila Luzon and Monét X Change both reveal that they would have eliminated Valentina from the competition. Latrice Royale confronts Monique Heart about her elimination vote.

On a new day, RuPaul greets the group and reveals the main challenge, which tasks the contestants with performing in a lip-sync tournament called "LaLaPaRUza". The previously eliminated contestants must choose one of the currently competing contestants, in the order that they were eliminated in, to lip-sync against. The winner of the lip-sync will remain in the competition. The loser of the lip-sync will be eliminated. Manila Luzon and Monét X Change, who won last week's challenge, are given immunity from the challenge. Before leaving, RuPaul shares the runway category for the fashion show ("LaLaPaRUza Eleganza").

Farrah Moan and Valentina connect on the status of their friendship. Some of the other contestants discuss who they plan to lip-sync against. Gia Gunn talks about being a trans woman and a drag performer. Manila Luzon and Monét X Change speculate about how the contestants might strategize. On the main stage, RuPaul welcomes fellow judges Michelle Visage, Carson Kressley, and Ross Mathews. RuPaul shares the runway category, then the fashion show commences, followed by the tournament.

The first lip-sync is between Jasmine Masters and Trinity the Tuck, who perform to "Peanut Butter" by RuPaul featuring Big Freedia. Trinity the Tuck wins the lip-sync and Jasmine Masters is eliminated. The second lip-sync is between Farrah Moan and Valentina, who perform to "Kitty Girl" by RuPaul. Valentina wins the lip-sync and Farrah Moan is eliminated. The third lip-sync is between Gia Gunn and Naomi Smalls, who perform to "Adrenaline" by RuPaul featuring Myah Marie. Naomi Smalls wins the lip-sync and Gia Gunn is eliminated. The final lip-sync is between Latrice Royale and Monique Heart, who perform to "Sissy That Walk" by RuPaul. Both are declared winners and Latrice Royale returns to the competition.

== Production ==
The episode originally aired on January 18, 2019. It has the show's first lip-sync tournament.

Bruno Alcantara and Shawn Morales are among members of the Pit Crew.

=== Fashion ===
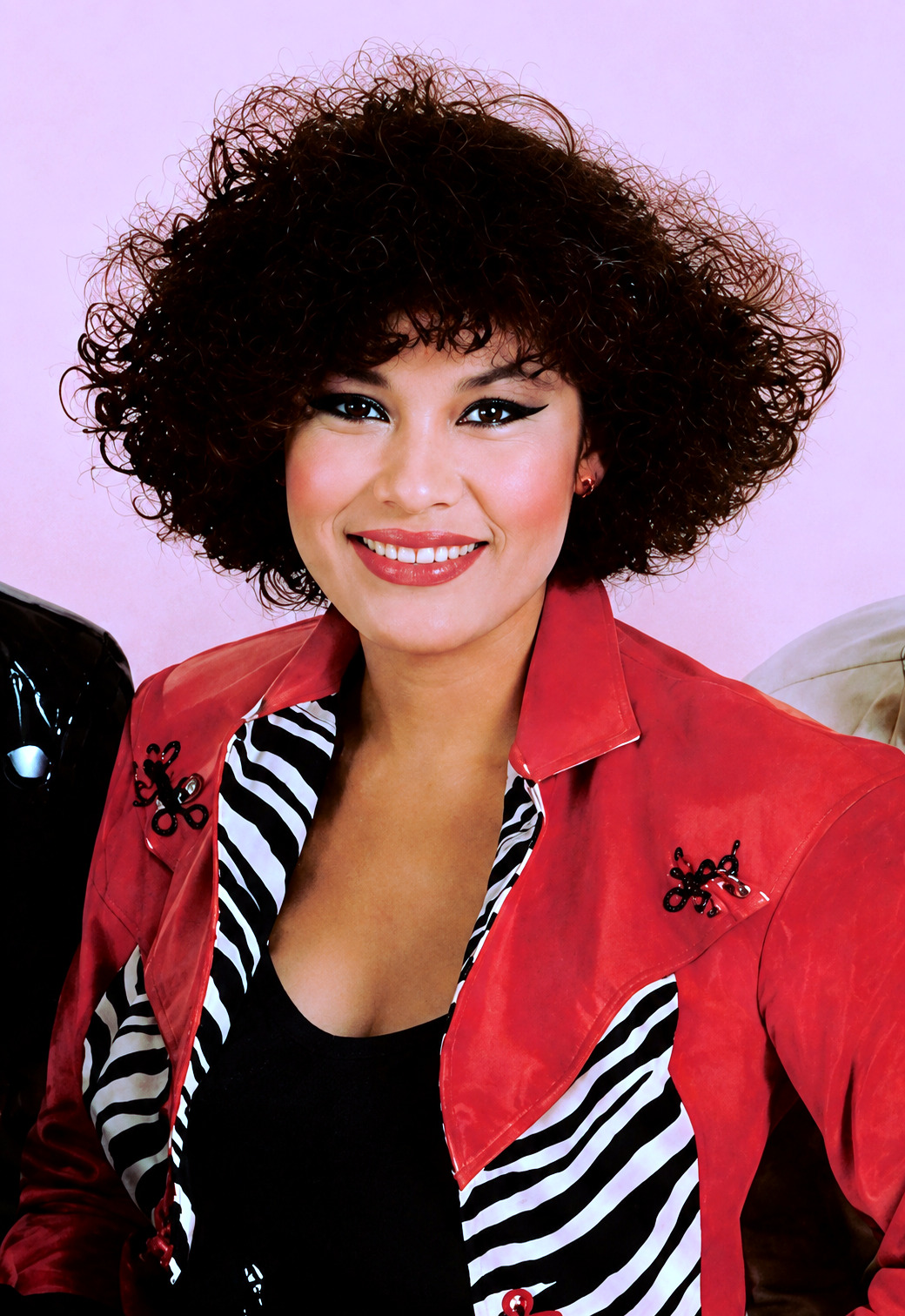
Valentina wears an outfit inspired by Selena (pictured in 1988).

In the workroom, RuPaul wears a brown suit with a white dress shirt and a cowboy hat. For the main stage, RuPaul has a short blue-and-pink dress, white hoop earrings, and a large blonde wig. Kressley has a purple plaid suit.

For the fashion show, Jasmine Masters wears a catsuit with a rose theme. Farrah Moan has a pink bodysuit with many ribbons. She wears tall boots and a blonde wig. Gia Gunn has a black suit-inspired outfit with a red necktie and a long dark ponytail. Latrice Royale wears a blue outfit with fringe and rhinestones. She has black boots and a blonde wig. Manila Luzon wears a red-and-white outfit with a spaghetti and meatballs theme. Monét X Change has a taupe dress. Monique Heart has a blue-and-purple outfit. Naomi Smalls wears a red leather outfit and a long brown wig. Trinity the Tuck has a black cloak and a blonde wig. Valentina wears a Selena-inspired red catsuit, hoop earrings, and a blonde wig. During her performance, Trinity the Tuck removes the cloak to reveal her outfit underneath, which includes tall green boots.

== Reception ==
Kate Kulzick of The A.V. Club gave the episode a rating of 'B-'. Writing for Vulture, Matt Rogers rated the episode five out of five stars. Sam Brooks ranked the "Peanut Butter" performance number 113 in The Spinoff's 2019 "definitive ranking" of 162 Drag Race lip-sync contests to date. "Kitty Girl", "Sissy That Walk", and "Adrenaline" ranked numbers 55, 17, and 7, respectively. In 2020, Andy Swift of TVLine called the "Adrenaline" contest a "stand-out moment" of the season.

== See also ==
- "Lip Sync LaLaPaRuza Smackdown" (RuPaul's Drag Race season 15), 2023 episode
- "Lip Sync LaLaPaRuza Smackdown – Reunited" (RuPaul's Drag Race season 16), 2024 episode
- "Lip Sync Lalaparuza Smackdown" (RuPaul's Drag Race season 17), 2025 episode
