= Tom Rubnitz =

American artist (1956–1992)

- Sister Dimension in "Strawberry Shortcut"
- Born: Thomas Block Rubnitz; April 2, 1956; Chicago, Illinois, U.S.
- Died: August 12, 1992 (aged 36); New York City, New York, U.S.
- Education: Kansas City Art Institute (BFA)

Thomas Block Rubnitz (April 2, 1956 – August 12, 1992) was an American painter, video artist, and AIDS activist. He was a part of the New York City drag world of the late 1980s, and he has been described as "an exuberant ethnographer of the East Village queer scene."

== Video art ==
Rubnitz was a pioneer of video art, and his underground films were inspired by pop culture and Las Vegas-style shows. A number of his works feature RuPaul and members of The B-52s. He was close with the actress, singer and Club 57 founder Ann Magnuson. He worked with East Village-associated artists including David Wojnarowicz, Lady Bunny, Hapi Phace, and John Sex. Rubnitz cameos as the bartender in the B-52s' music video Love Shack.

Rubnitz and the B-52s produced a public service announcement for the Art Against AIDS organization's "Summer of Love" project in 1987. The work visually referenced the cover of Sgt. Pepper's Lonely Hearts Club Band by The Beatles in tableau vivant form, featuring the B-52s, Willi Ninja, Allen Ginsberg, Nam Jun Paik, Quentin Crisp, Lady Bunny, David Byrne, and others.

His works also include the spoof cooking videos "Strawberry Shortcut" and "Pickle Surprise" (1989).

The film "Listen to This" (1992), a collaboration with David Wojnarowicz and unfinished at the time of his death, critiques the Reagan and Bush Administrations for their failures addressing the AIDS crisis. The film was shown at MoMA's 2017–18 exhibit Club 57: Film, Performance, and Art in the East Village, 1978–1983. It was also shown at OutFest in Los Angeles in 2014, and at Seoul International New Media in 2015.

Rubnitz said of his art, "I wanted to make things beautiful, funny and positive—escapes that you could just get into and laugh through. That was really important to me."

== Personal life ==
Rubnitz was born in Chicago in 1956. He graduated from New Trier High School in Winnetka, Illinois, and then attended the Kansas City Art Institute in Missouri, where he earned a B.F.A. Rubnitz later moved to New York City, where he worked at the Phyllis Kind Gallery in SoHo, known for showcasing outsider art and Chicago-based artists. Rubnitz was openly gay, and worked through his art to raise awareness of HIV/AIDS and the need for a cure. He died of an AIDS-related illness in August 1992, at the age of 36.
