= Joseph Minion =

American screenwriter

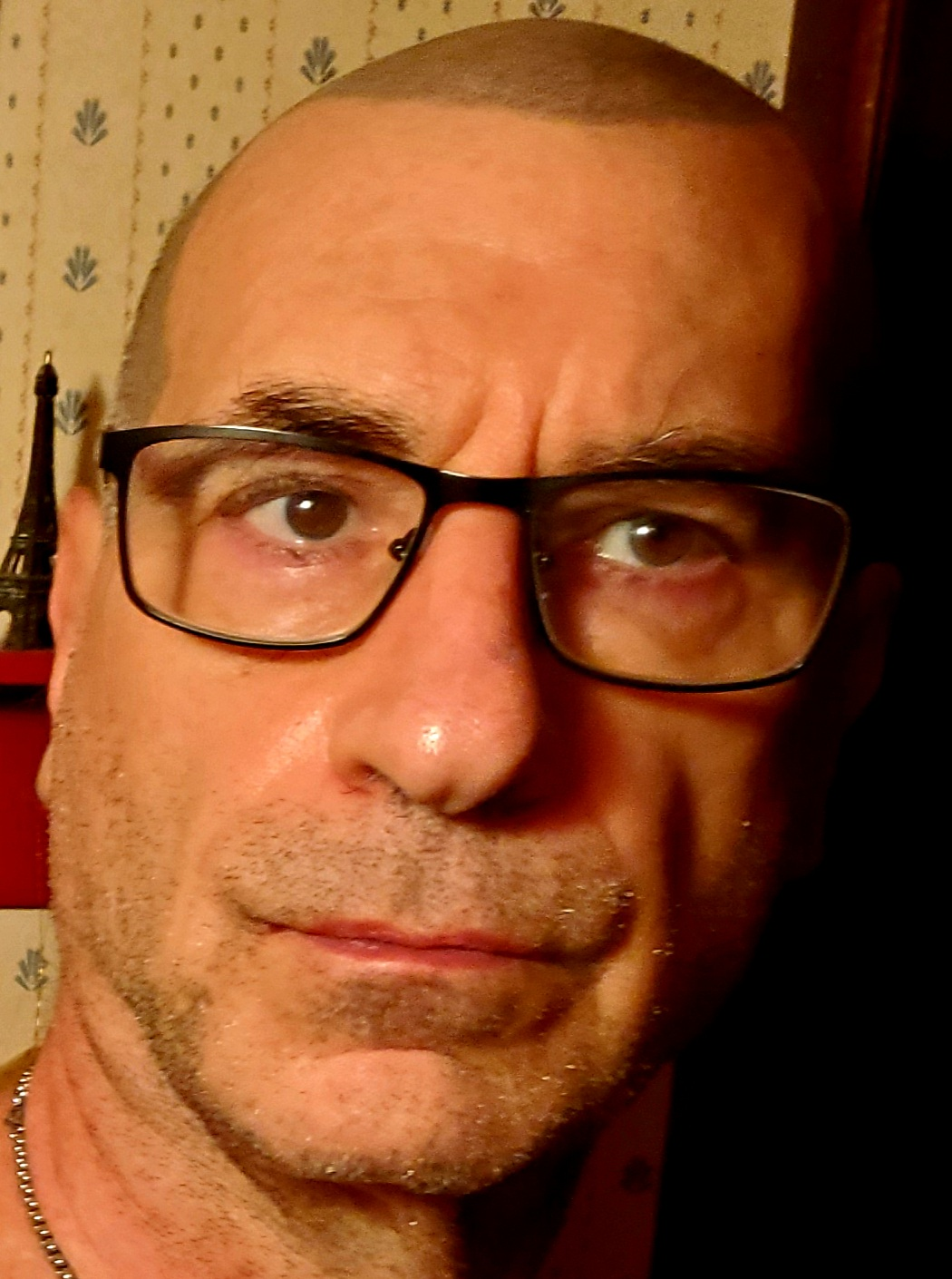
- Minion in 2020
- Born: 1957 (age 68–69); New Jersey, U.S.
- Education: Rutgers University; Columbia University
- Occupation: Screenwriter

Joseph Minion (born 1957) is an American screenwriter. His writing credits include After Hours (1985), Vampire's Kiss (1988), Motorama (1991), On the Run (1999) and episodes of Amazing Stories and Tales from the Crypt. He also directed the films Daddy's Boys (1988) and Trafficking (1999).

== Biography ==
Born in New Jersey in 1957, Minion briefly attended NYU Film School before finishing his studies at Columbia University for screenwriting. In 1984, Minion's script for After Hours was optioned by Griffin Dunne and Amy Robinson. Robinson sent Minion's screenplay to Scorsese, whose Last Temptation of Christ had recently fallen through; production on After Hours started shortly afterward. The following year, Scorsese directed Minion's script for the Amazing Stories episode "Mirror Mirror".

As a director, Minion made his debut for producer Roger Corman with 1988's Daddy's Boys. Vampire's Kiss, scripted by Minion, was released in the same year. 1991 saw the release of the Minion scripted Tales from the Crypt episode "Loved to Death" and the film Motorama. In 1999, Minion scripted the films On the Run and Trafficking, the latter of which he also directed and produced.

== Personal life ==
He lives in New York and his studio is in East Orange, N.J. Throughout his career he has taught film and screenwriting at the School of Visual Arts, USC, the North Carolina School of Arts, Long Island University and the New York University School of Continuing Education.

== Filmography ==
Films

Year	Title	Director	Writer	Producer	Notes	Ref.
1981	The Office	Yes	Yes	Yes	Short film	
1985	After Hours	No	Yes	No		
1987	Julia and Julia	No	Yes	No		
1988	Daddy's Boys	Yes	No	No		
1988	Vampire's Kiss	No	Yes	No		
1991	Motorama	No	Yes	No		
1999	On the Run	No	Yes	No		
1999	Trafficking	Yes	Yes	Yes		
2005	The Collection	No	Yes	No		
2014	Airport 2012	Yes	Yes	Yes	Short film	

Television

Year	Title	Director	Writer	Producer	Notes	Ref(s)
1986	Amazing Stories	No	Yes	No	Episode "Mirror Mirror"	
1991	Tales from the Crypt	No	Yes	No	Episode "Loved to Death"	
1993	Route 66	No	Yes	No	Episode "Dream Lover"	
