= Vampire's Kiss =

1988 US black comedy film by Robert Bierman

- Theatrical release poster
- Directed by: Robert Bierman
- Written by: Joseph Minion
- Produced by: John Daly; Derek Gibson; Barry Shils; Barbara Zitwer
- Starring: Nicolas Cage; María Conchita Alonso; Jennifer Beals; Elizabeth Ashley
- Cinematography: Stefan Czapsky
- Edited by: Angus Newton
- Music by: Colin Towns
- Production companies: Hemdale Film Corporation; Magellan Pictures
- Distributed by: Hemdale Film Corporation
- Release date: June 2, 1989
- Running time: 103 minutes
- Country: United States
- Language: English
- Budget: $2 million
- Box office: $725,131

Vampire's Kiss is a 1989 American black comedy film directed by Robert Bierman and written by Joseph Minion. Starring Nicolas Cage, María Conchita Alonso, Jennifer Beals, and Elizabeth Ashley, the film tells the story of a literary agent who falls in love with a vampire. The film later developed a cult following largely due to Cage's "scorched-earth acting", which has become a source of many Internet memes.

== Plot ==
Peter Loew is a New York City-based literary agent and a narcissistic yuppie, with little in his life but work, one-night stands, and frequent appointments with his therapist, Dr. Glaser. Peter brings home a woman named Jackie from a club, but they are interrupted when a bat flies through the window; he later tells Dr. Glaser that his struggle with the bat aroused him. At his office, Peter torments a secretary, Alva Restrepo, with repeated demands to find an obscure missing document.

At a nightclub, Peter meets a mysterious woman named Rachel and takes her home. In bed, she exposes her vampire fangs and bites him on the neck, with Peter succumbing to pleasure as she feeds on his blood. The following morning, Peter is seen with an uninjured neck, but cuts himself shaving and applies a bandage. He serves coffee and makes conversation with a non-existent Rachel, casting doubt on the reality of their encounter.

Visiting an art museum with Jackie, Peter abruptly ditches her, and she leaves him an angry phone message. In therapy, he seems not to remember the incident with the bat, and browbeats Alva when she is unable to find the missing contract. His severe mood swings lead to public outbursts, and he makes an apologetic call to Jackie to arrange another date. As he is about to leave, he is drawn into bed by the appearance of Rachel, who again drains his blood, while a dejected Jackie leaves him an angry note to stay away.

At work, an erratic Peter chases Alva into the bathroom and laughs off the incident with his colleagues, but continues to humiliate and threaten her. Finding Jackie’s note, he destroys his apartment in a fit of rage, and unsettles Dr. Glaser with his bizarre rants. Growing sensitive to light, he wears sunglasses indoors and collapses on the street at the sight of a crucifix. Believing the bandage on his neck to be the location of Rachel's vampire bite, his delusions of her nighttime feedings persist, as does his unhinged behavior, including eating cockroaches.

Alva stays home to avoid an increasingly frightening Peter, who arrives at her door and manipulates her into returning to work with him. She confides in her brother Emilio, who gives her blanks for the gun she carries in her purse. Peter fails to see his reflection in mirrors as his mental state deteriorates, and chases Alva through the building after hours. Begging her to shoot him, Peter forces himself on her while hallucinating she is Rachel. Overcome by despair, he fires the gun into his mouth, but assumes his “transformation” has saved him.

Fully believing himself to be a vampire, Peter purchases cheap novelty fangs and catches pigeons to eat in his wrecked apartment, which he turns into a darkened lair. Sleeping under his upturned sofa as though it were a coffin, he emerges at night and goes to a club, wearing his plastic fangs and behaving like Orlok from the film Nosferatu. He tries to seduce a woman before attacking her with his real teeth, leaving her unconscious and bloody, and hallucinates a disdainful Rachel abandoning him for another man.

On the dance floor, Peter finds the real Rachel, who appears to recognize him from a past date. He attempts to manhandle her into revealing her fangs, but is dragged out of the club. Wandering the streets covered in blood, Peter begs passersby to end his suffering with a wooden stake, while newspaper headlines confirm that the woman he attacked in the club has died. He hallucinates a therapy session with Dr. Glaser, who laughs off his crimes and introduces him to “Sharon”, another patient and his romantic match.

A traumatized Alva tells Emilio about her assault, and they find Peter as he returns to his apartment with the imaginary Sharon, where his fantasy dissolves into an abusive argument. Emilio forces his way inside and confronts Peter, who offers up the shard of wood, and impales Peter. Peter envisions the vampire Rachel one last time as he dies.

== Cast ==
- Nicolas Cage as Peter Loew, a literary agent whose outlandish descent into madness leaves him increasingly isolated
- María Conchita Alonso as Alva Restrepo, secretary to Peter and constant victim to his rants and impatience
- Jennifer Beals as Rachel, the seductive vampire that initially haunts Peter and pushes him into his vampire-like state, eventually falling in love with him
- Kasi Lemmons as Jackie, a romantic interest of Peter whom he later stands up in favor of a night with Rachel
- Bob Lujan as Emilio, the protective brother of Alva who supplies her with a gun and blank ammunition
- Elizabeth Ashley as Dr. Glaser, the therapist in Peter's real and imaginary worlds

In addition, Jessica Lundy plays Sharon, the patient his therapist sets Peter up with, Cage's brother Marc Coppola briefly appears as the joke guy, and the musical group ESG has a cameo performing in a club. John Michael Higgins plays Ed, and David Hyde Pierce plays a theater guy.

== Production ==
The screenplay for Vampire's Kiss was written by Joseph Minion in January 1986 during a two-week period spent alone in a hotel room in Barbados. The script originated under difficult personal circumstances: Minion, then recovering from the intense experience of his debut feature After Hours (1985) and stalled on another project, was encouraged by his then-girlfriend, producer Barbara Zitwer, to write a new work that might improve his mood. Although Zitwer initially suggested a story set in the Caribbean, Minion instead produced a dark psychological comedy about a narcissistic literary agent who descends into madness after believing he has been bitten by a vampire.

Upon receiving the completed screenplay, Zitwer and co-producer Barry Shils, together with associate producer and casting director Marcia Shulman, decided to produce the film independently. Financing was secured through Hemdale Film Corporation, headed by John Daly, with a budget of approximately $2 million.

Casting the lead role of Peter Loew proved protracted. Dennis Quaid was initially attached but withdrew to star in Innerspace (1987). Nicolas Cage expressed strong interest early on, briefly accepted the part, then withdrew when Minion decided not to direct. After unsuccessful attempts to interest actors such as Judd Nelson and Steve Martin, and a brief consideration of an unknown performer, Cage rejoined the production following persistent efforts by the producers. He was ultimately paid a reduced fee of $40,000. Jennifer Beals was cast as the vampire Rachel shortly before filming began, while María Conchita Alonso played the secretary Alva.

With Minion no longer directing, the producers hired British filmmaker Robert Bierman, previously known for commercials and short films. Principal photography took place in New York City over seven weeks in the autumn of 1987. The production operated on a limited budget, using vacant city buildings for office interiors and shooting night exteriors on actual streets. The shoot was described by participants as chaotic yet creatively energizing, with much of the city's atmosphere of the period incorporated directly into the film.

Nicolas Cage's intensely physical and expressionistic performance drew inspiration from German silent cinema (particularly Nosferatu (1922)) and rejected naturalistic acting conventions. Some improvisations approved by Bierman included choreographed gestures and an affected Transatlantic accent inspired by Cage's father; the only significant unscripted addition was Cage's consumption of a live cockroach in place of a raw egg called for in the original screenplay. Cage remained deeply immersed in character throughout filming.

Post-production was constrained by financial shortages; the orchestral score was recorded in Budapest for cost reasons, and final sound mixing required borrowed funds, and certain scenes were trimmed at the distributor's request.

== Release ==
Hemsdale delayed the film's release for approximately 18 months. It was released June 2, 1989 and grossed $725,131 in the U.S. It was released on home video in August 1990. MGM released it on DVD in August 2002, and Scream Factory released it on Blu-ray in February 2015. It was subsequently re-released on Blu-Ray through the MVD Rewind label in June 2022.

== Reception ==
On the review aggregator website Rotten Tomatoes, 64% of 33 critics' reviews are positive. The website's consensus reads: "He's a vampire! He's a vampire! He's a vampire!" Metacritic assigned the film a weighted average score of 30 out of 100, based on 11 critics, indicating "generally unfavorable reviews".

Variety wrote, "Cage's over-the-top performance generates little sympathy for the character, so it's tough to be interested in him as his personality disorder worsens."

Caryn James of The New York Times wrote, "[T]he film is dominated and destroyed by Mr. Cage's chaotic, self-indulgent performance." Kevin Thomas of the Los Angeles Times called it "a sleek, outrageous dark comedy that's all the funnier for constantly teetering on the brink of sheer tastelessness and silliness."

Hal Hinson of The Washington Post called the film "stone-dead bad, incoherently bad", but said that Cage's overacting must be seen to be believed. Carrie Rickey of The Philadelphia Inquirer called it an "imaginative, if warped, black comedy" that "succeeds as a wicked allegory of What Men Want".

Rolling Stone critic Peter Travers wrote that the film needs "a stake through the heart". Reviewing the film on Blu-ray, Anthony Arrigo of Bloody Disgusting wrote, "The film may not work very well as a comedy, but there's enough of a dark derangement present to make it almost unsettling."

== See also ==
- Vampire film
