= The First Bite =

EP by Cara Cunningham
- Released: March 19, 2011
- Recorded: 2010–2011
- Genre: Dance, electronica, pop
- Length: 17:09
- Label: Self released, Roadrunner
- Producer: Cara Cunningham, Joey Sturgis

Cara Cunningham chronology
| The First Bite (2011) | Walls Down (2013) |

Singles from The First Bite
- 1. "Freak of Nature" Released: November 30, 2010; 2. "I Want Your Bite" Released: February 14, 2011

Alternate cover

Professional ratings
Review scores
| Source | Rating |
|---|---|
| YAM Magazine | 2/5 stars |

The First Bite is the first extended play by American recording artist Cara Cunningham, released on March 19, 2011. The extended play consists of two singles and three unreleased songs. The album includes the singles "Freak of Nature" which was released on November 30, 2010, and "I Want Your Bite" on February 14, 2011.

== Track listing ==
| No. | Title | Length |
|---|---|---|
| 1. | "One Day" | 3:41 |
| 2. | "Fly Swat" | 3:14 |
| 3. | "Freak of Nature" | 3:25 |
| 4. | "I Want Your Bite" | 3:23 |
| 5. | "Enough Is Enough" | 3:30 |
| Total length: | | 17:09 |

== Personnel ==
- Cara Cunningham – vocals
