= Love Child (2014 film) =

2014 documentary film directed by Valerie Veatch

- Promotional poster
- Directed by: Valerie Veatch
- Written by: Valerie Veatch
- Produced by: David Foox; Valerie Veatch; Dong Hyun Danny Kim; Minji Kim; Daniel Levin
- Cinematography: Daniel Levin
- Edited by: Valerie Veatch; Christopher Donlon
- Production company: HBO
- Release date: January 17, 2014 (Sundance Film Festival)
- Running time: 75 minutes
- Countries: South Korea; United States
- Language: English

Love Child is a 2014 South Korean-American documentary film directed by Valerie Veatch. Veatch produced the film with David Foox. The film premiered in-competition in the World Cinema Documentary Competition at 2014 Sundance Film Festival on January 17, 2014.

The film was theatrically released by HBO on June 18, 2014.

== Synopsis ==
The film narrates the story of a South Korean couple, who were immersed in an online game called Prius Online, while their baby named Sarang died of malnutrition.

== Reception ==
Love Child received mixed to positive reviews upon its premiere at the 2014 Sundance Film Festival. Christie Ko in his review for ScreenCrave gave the film 6/10 and said that "This documentary is not an exhaustive look at the addiction to gaming, but does a good job of explaining this incident of the couple and their baby in South Korea. It is thorough in its treatment of their story. But it scratched the surface of broader implications that left me with many questions." While, Daniel Fienberg of HitFix said in his review that Love Child never attempts to cheapen the tragedy of Sarang's death, but like "Web Junkie," it wants to lay out a pattern of behavior that might seem a little extreme, but also won't feel that outlandish to anybody who counts the Internet among the spaces in which they feel most social."
