= RuPaul discography =

Discography of American drag queen RuPaul

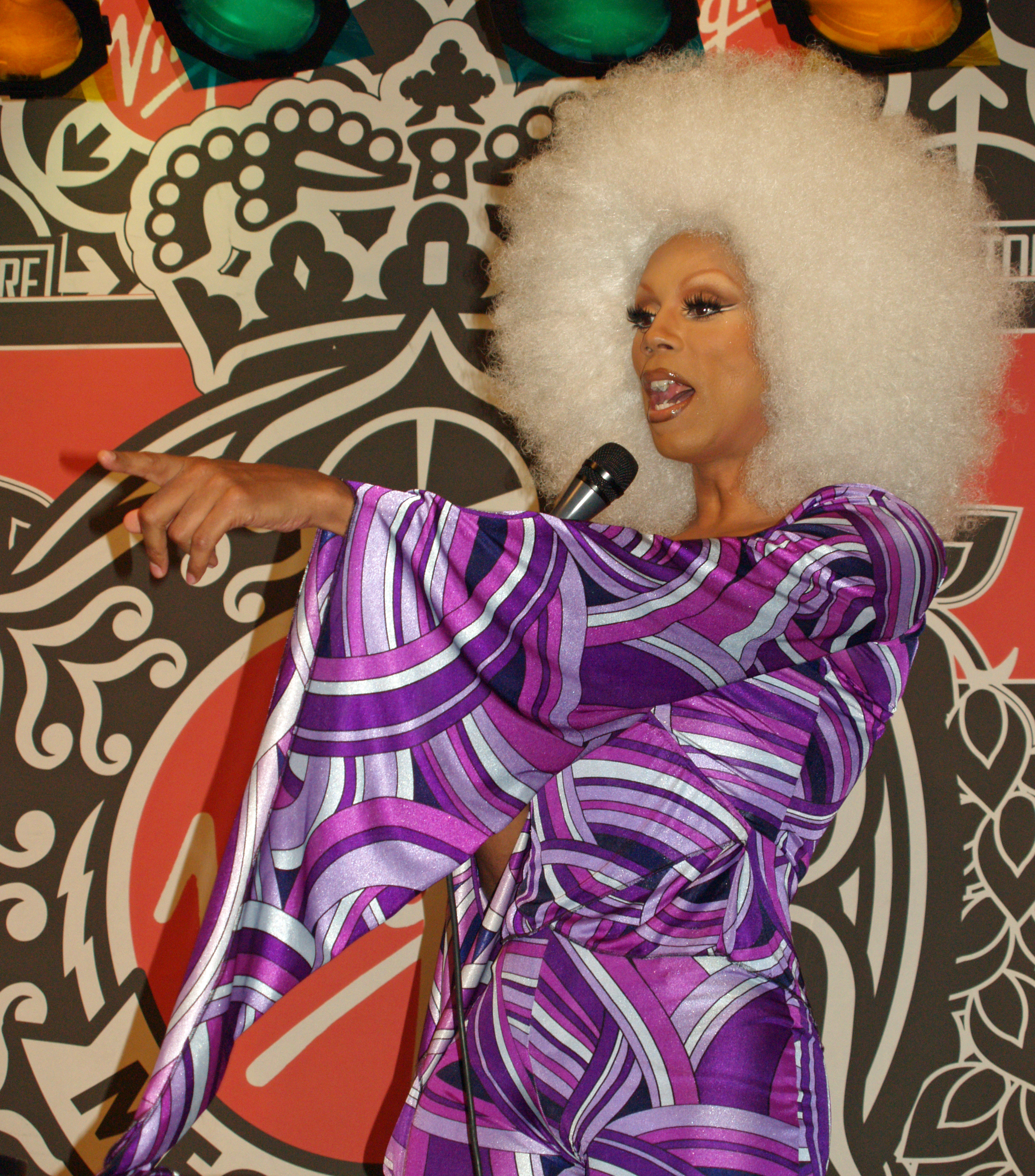
- RuPaul at a party for the launch of the Starrbooty DVD
- Studio albums: 15
- Extended plays: 6
- Soundtrack albums: 4
- Compilation albums: 7
- Remix albums: 7
- Singles: 75
- Promotional singles: 8
- Music videos: 43

American drag queen and singer RuPaul has released 15 studio albums, 6 extended plays (EPs), 4 soundtrack albums, 7 compilation albums, 7 remix albums, 75 singles (including 3 as a featured artist), 8 promotional singles, and 43 music videos.

RuPaul reached commercial success in the United States with his debut album, Supermodel of the World, which reached number 109 on the US Billboard 200. The album contained RuPaul's signature song, "Supermodel (You Better Work)". The song reached number 45 on the Billboard Hot 100 and was a Top 5 single on the Hot Dance Club Play chart in 1993. Since then, RuPaul has released fourteen more studio albums, although none featured a single that charted as high as "Supermodel (You Better Work)". In 2014, coinciding with the release of season six of his show RuPaul's Drag Race, his album Born Naked reached number 85 on Billboard 200, making it his current highest-charting album.

== Albums ==
=== Studio albums ===
Title	Details	Peak chart positions					
Title	Details	US	US Elec	US Heat	US Indie	UK DL	UK Indie
Supermodel of the World	Release date: June 8, 1993; Label: Tommy Boy Records; Formats: LP, CD, cassette, digital download	109	—	1	—	—	—
Foxy Lady	Release date: October 29, 1996; Label: Rhino Records; Formats: CD, cassette, digital download	—	—	15	—	—	—
Ho Ho Ho	Release date: October 28, 1997; Label: Rhino Records; Formats: CD, cassette, digital download	—	—	27	—	—	—
Red Hot	Release date: September 21, 2004; Label: RuCo Inc.; Formats: CD, digital download	—	9	—	—	—	—
Champion	Release date: February 24, 2009; Label: RuCo Inc.; Formats: CD, digital download	—	12	26	—	—	—
Glamazon	Release date: May 3, 2011; Label: RuCo Inc.; Formats: CD, digital download	—	11	8	—	—	—
Born Naked	Release date: February 24, 2014; Label: RuCo Inc.; Formats: Digital download	85	4	—	18	—	—
Realness	Release date: March 2, 2015; Label: RuCo Inc.; Formats: Digital download	—	6	—	38	—	41
Slay Belles	Release date: October 23, 2015; Label: RuCo Inc.; Formats: CD, digital download	—	21	—	—	—	—
Butch Queen	Release date: March 4, 2016; Label: RuCo Inc.; Formats: CD, Digital download	—	3	—	46	—	—
American	Release date: March 24, 2017; Label: RuCo Inc.; Formats: LP, Digital download	—	12	—	30	58	46
Christmas Party	Release date: November 1, 2018; Label: RuCo Inc.; Formats: Digital download	—	— (Note: Christmas Party did not enter the Billboard Dance/Electronic Album Chart, but did peak at number 2 on the Billboard Dance/Electronic Album Sales Chart)	—	—	—	—
You're a Winner, Baby	Release date: January 10, 2020; Label: RuCo Inc., The Orchard; Formats: Digital download	—	—	—	—	36	—
Mamaru	Release date: January 7, 2022; Label: RuCo Inc., The Orchard; Formats: Digital download	—	—	—	—	35	—
Black Butta	Release date: January 6, 2023; Label: RuCo Inc.; Formats: Digital download	—	—	—	—	73	—
"—" denotes a recording that did not chart or was not released in that territory.

=== Soundtrack albums ===
Title	Details
RuPaul Is Star Booty	Release date: 1986; Label: Funtone Records, Every Records; Formats: LP, CD
Starrbooty: Original Motion Picture Soundtrack	Release date: Jun 19, 2007; Label: RuCo Inc.; Formats: CD, digital download
AJ and The Queen (Original Television Soundtrack) (with Lior Rosner)	Release date: January 24, 2020; Label: WaterTower; Formats: Digital download
RuPaul's Drag Race Live: The Official Vegas Soundtrack	Release date: January 27, 2020; Label: RuCo, Inc.; Formats: Digital Download

=== Compilation albums ===
Title	Details	Peak chart positions	
Title	Details	US Dance Sales	US Indie
RuPaul's Go-Go Box Classics	Release date: March 17, 1998; Label: Rhino; Formats: CD	—	—
RuPaul Presents: The CoverGurlz	Release date: January 28, 2014; Label: World of Wonder; Formats: Digital download	—	—
RuPaul Presents: CoverGurlz 2	Release date: February 3, 2015; Label: World of Wonder; Formats: Digital download	—	—
Greatest Hits	Release date: May 16, 2015; Label: RuCo Inc.; Formats: Vinyl	—	—
Essential, Vol. 2	Release date: June 9, 2017; Label: RuCo Inc.; Formats: Digital download	9	—
Essential Christmas	Release date: October 20, 2023; Label: RuCo Inc.; Formats: Digital download	—	—
Essential, Vol. 3	Release date: January 5, 2024; Label: RuCo Inc.; Formats: Digital download		—

=== Remix albums ===
Title	Details
ReWorked	Release date: June 13, 2006; Label: RuCo Inc.; Formats: CD, digital download
Drag Race	Release date: March 30, 2010; Label: RuCo Inc.; Formats: CD, digital download
SuperGlam DQ	Release date: July 16, 2011; Label: RuCo Inc.; Formats: CD, digital download
Butch Queen: Remixes	Release date: April 15, 2016; Label: RuCo Inc.; Formats: Digital download
Remember Me: Essential, Vol. 1	Release date: February 3, 2017; Label: RuCo Inc.; Formats: Digital download
Queen of Queens	Release date: April 29, 2019; Label: RuCo Inc.; Formats: Digital download
Good Luck and Don’t F**k It Up	Release date: January 3, 2025; Label: RuCo Inc.; Formats: Digital download

== Extended plays ==
Title	Details
Sex Freak	Release date: 1985; Label: Funtone Records; Formats: LP, CD, Cassette
Say My Name (with Discobrothers)	Release date: May 12, 2008; Label: UCA; Formats: Digital download
Hey Sis, It's Christmas!	Release date: October 23, 2020; Label: RuCo, Inc.; Formats: Digital Download
RuPaul in London	Release date: January 22, 2021; Label: RuCo, Inc.; Formats: Digital Download
New Friends Silver, Old Friends Gold	Release date: March 8, 2021; Label: RuCo, Inc.; Formats: Digital Download
Everybody Say Love	Release date: July 12, 2024; Label: RuCo, Inc.; Formats: Digital Download

== Singles ==
=== As lead artist ===
Title	Year	Peak chart positions					Certifications	Album
Title	Year	US	US Dance/ Elec.	US Dance Club	AUS	UK	Certifications	Album
"I've Got That Feelin'"	1991	—	—	—	—	—		Non-album single
"Supermodel (You Better Work)"	1992	45	— (Note: "Supermodel (You Better Work)" did not chart on the Dance/Electronic Songs Chart, but did peak at number 4 on the Dance Singles Sales Chart, a component chart that was later discontinued and merged into the Dance/Electronic Songs Chart.)	2	115	39	RIAA: Gold	Supermodel of the World
"Back to My Roots"	1993	— (Note: "Back to My Roots" did not enter the Billboard Hot 100, but peaked at number 6 on the Bubbling Under Hot 100 Singles chart.)	— (Note: "Back to my Roots" did not chart on the Dance/Electronic Songs Chart, but did peak at number 1 on the Dance Singles Sales Chart, a component chart that was later discontinued and merged into the Dance/Electronic Songs Chart.)	1	90	40		Supermodel of the World
"A Shade Shady (Now Prance)"	1993	—	— (Note: "A Shade Shady (Now Prance)" did not chart on the Dance/Electronic Songs Chart, but did peak at number 18 on the Dance Singles Sales Chart, a component chart that was later discontinued and merged into the Dance/Electronic Songs Chart)	1	—	—		Supermodel of the World
"House of Love"	1993	—	—	—	—	40		Supermodel of the World
"Everybody Dance"	1993	—	—	—	—	—		Supermodel of the World
"Little Drummer Boy"	1993	— (Note: "Little Drummer Boy" did not chart on the Billboard Hot 100, but did peak at number 13 on the Bubbling Under Hot 100 chart)	— (Note: "Little Drummer Boy" did not chart on the Dance/Electronic Songs Chart, but did peak at number 5 on the Dance Singles Sales Chart, a component chart that was later discontinued and merged into the Dance/Electronic Songs Chart)	—	—	—		Non-album single
"Don't Go Breaking My Heart" (with Elton John)	1994	92	— (Note: "Don't Go Breaking My Heart" did not chart on the Dance/Electronic Songs Chart, but did peak at number 10 on the Dance Singles Sales Chart, a component chart that was later discontinued and merged into the Dance/Electronic Songs Chart)	3	45	7		Duets
"Snapshot"	1996	95	— (Note: "Snapshot" did not chart on the Dance/Electronic Songs Chart, but did peak at number 10 on the Dance Singles Sales Chart, a component chart that was later discontinued and merged into the Dance/Electronic Songs Chart)	4	—	—		Foxy Lady
"A Little Bit of Love"	1997	— (Note: "A Little Bit of Love" did not enter the Billboard Hot 100, but peaked at number 19 on the Bubbling Under Hot 100 Singles chart.)	— (Note: "A Little Bit of Love" did not chart on the Dance/Electronic Songs Chart, but did peak at number 41 on the Dance Singles Sales Chart, a component chart that was later discontinued and merged into the Dance/Electronic Songs Chart)	28	—	—		Foxy Lady
"Celebrate"	1997	—	—	31	—	—		Foxy Lady
"Looking Good, Feeling Gorgeous"	2004	—	—	2	—	—		Red Hot
"WorkOut"	2005	—	—	5	—	—		Red Hot
"People Are People" (featuring Tom Trujillo)	2006	—	—	10	—	—		Red Hot
"SuperModel (You Better Work)" (The RuMixes) (featuring Shirley Q. Liquor)	2006	—	—	21	—	—		ReWorked
"Call Me Starrbooty"	2007	—	—	—	—	—		Starrbooty: Original Motion Picture Soundtrack
"Cover Girl"	2009	—	— (Note: "Cover Girl" did not chart on the Dance/Electronic Songs Chart, but did peak at number 7 on the Dance Singles Sales Chart, a component chart that was later discontinued and merged into the Dance/Electronic Songs Chart.)	16	—	—		Champion
"Jealous of My Boogie"	2009	—	— (Note: "Jealous of My Boogie" did not enter the Billboard Top Dance/Electronic Songs chart, but peaked at number 26 on the Dance/Electronic Digital Songs Sales chart)	55	—	—		Champion
"Devil Made Me Do It"	2009	—	—	—	—	—		Champion
"Tranny Chaser"	2010	—	—	—	—	—		Champion
"Champion"	2011	—	— (Note: "Superstar" did not enter the Billboard Top Dance/Electronic Songs chart, but peaked at number 49 on the Dance/Electronic Digital Songs Sales chart)	—	—	—		Champion
"Superstar"	2011	—	— (Note: "Superstar" did not enter the Billboard Top Dance/Electronic Songs chart, but peaked at number 48 on the Dance/Electronic Digital Songs Sales chart)	—	—	—		Glamazon
"Glamazon"	2011	—	—	—	—	—		Glamazon
"Peanut Butter" (featuring Big Freedia)	2012	—	—	—	—	—		Non-album singles
"Sexy Drag Queen"	2012	—	—	—	—	—		Non-album singles
"Responsitrannity"	2012	—	—	—	—	—		Glamazon
"Theme from Drag U"	2012	—	—	—	—	—		Non-album single
"Live Forever"	2012	—	—	—	—	—		Glamazon
"Here It Comes (Around Again)"	2012	—	— (Note: "Here It Comes (Around Again)" did not chart on the Dance/Electronic Songs Chart, but did peak at number 2 on the Dance Singles Sales Chart, a component chart that was later discontinued and merged into the Dance/Electronic Songs Chart.)	—	—	—		Glamazon
"If I Dream"	2012	—	—	—	—	—		Glamazon
"Lick It Lollipop" (featuring Lady Bunny)	2013	—	—	—	—	—		Non-album single
"I Bring the Beat"	2013	—	—	—	—	—		Glamazon
"The Beginning"	2013	—	—	—	—	—		Glamazon
"Geronimo"	2014	—	—	—	—	—		Born Naked
"Sissy That Walk"	2014	—	27	55	—	—		Born Naked
"Modern Love"	2015	—	—	—	—	—		Born Naked
"Born Naked"	2015	—	—	—	—	—		Born Naked
"Born Naked" (Stadium Remix) (featuring Clairy Browne)	2015	—	—	—	—	—		Realness
"U Wear It Well"	2016	—	—	—	—	—		Butch Queen
"Be Someone"	2016	—	—	—	—	—		Butch Queen
"The Realness"	2016	—	—	—	—	—		Realness
"Read U Wrote U" (featuring the cast of RuPaul's Drag Race All Stars, Season 2)	2016	—	29	—	—	—		Non-album single
"Snapshot" (Remix)	2017	—	—	—	—	—		Remember Me: Essential, Vol. 1
"Category Is" (Cast Version) (featuring the cast of RuPaul's Drag Race, Season 9)	2017	—	—	—	—	—		Non-album single
"Call Me Mother"	2017	—	47	—	—	—		American
"Kitty Girl" (Cast Version) (featuring the cast of RuPaul's Drag Race All Stars, Season 3)	2018	—	18	—	—	—		Non-album singles
"American" (Cast Version) (featuring the cast of RuPaul's Drag Race, Season 10)	2018	—	— (Note: "American (Season 10 RuMix)" did not enter the Billboard Hot Dance/Electronic Songs Chart, but peaked at number 12 on the Dance/Electronic Digital Song Sales chart)	—	—	—		Non-album singles
"Super Queen (Cast Version)" (featuring the cast of RuPaul's Drag Race All Stars, Season 4)	2019	—	—	—	—	—		Non-album singles
"Queens Everywhere (Cast Version)" (featuring the cast of RuPaul's Drag Race, Season 11)	2019	—	— (Note: "Queens Everywhere (Cast Version)" did not enter the Billboard Hot Dance/Electronic Songs Chart, but peaked at number 20 on the Dance/Electronic Digital Song Sales chart)	—	—	—		Non-album singles
"To the Moon (Cast Version)" (featuring the cast of RuPaul's Drag Race UK, Series 1)	2019	—	—	—	—	—		Non-album singles
"I'm That Bitch" (solo or with the cast of RuPaul's Drag Race, Season 12)	2020	—	49	—	—	—		Non-album singles
"Bring Back My Girls"	2020	—	—	—	—	—		You're a Winner, Baby
"Clap Back" (featuring the Cast of RuPaul's Drag Race All Stars, Season 5)	2020	—	—	—	—	—		Non-album singles
"U Wear It Well" (Cast Version) (featuring the Cast of Canada's Drag Race, Season 1) [Queens of the North Ru-Mix]	2020	—	—	—	—	—		Non-album singles
"A Little Bit of Love" (Cast Version) (featuring the Cast of RuPaul's Drag Race UK, Series 2)	2021	—	—	—	—	—		Non-album singles
"Lucky" (featuring the Cast of RuPaul's Drag Race, Season 13)	2021	—	—	—	—	—		Non-album singles
"I'm a Winner, Baby" (Cast Version) (featuring the Cast of RuPaul's Drag Race Down Under, Season 1)	2021	—	—	—	—	—		Non-album singles
"This Is Our Country" (with Tanya Tucker and the cast of RuPaul's Drag Race All Stars, Season 6)	2021	—	—	—	—	—		Non-album singles
"Blame It on the Edit" (solo or with the Cast of RuPaul's Drag Race, Season 15)	2021	—	—	—	—	—		Mamaru
"Just What They Want"	2021	—	—	—	—	—		Mamaru
"Hey Sis, It's Christmas" (Cast Version) (featuring the Cast of RuPaul's Drag Race UK, Series 3)	2021	—	—	—	—	—		Non-album single
"Catwalk" (featuring Skeltal Ki or the Cast of RuPaul's Drag Race, Season 14)	2021	—	42	—	—	—		Mamaru
"Smile"	2022	—	—	—	—	—		Mamaru
"Living My Life in London" (Cast Version) (featuring the cast of RuPaul's Drag Race UK vs. the World, season 1)	2022	—	—	—	—	—		Non-album singles
"Champion (Ru x Blu)" (with Blu Hydrangea)	2022	—	—	—	—	—		Non-album singles
"Legends" (Cast Version) (featuring the cast of RuPaul's Drag Race All Stars, season 7)	2022	—	—	—	—	—		Non-album singles
"Who Is She?" (Cast Version) (featuring the cast of RuPaul's Drag Race Down Under, season 2)	2022	—	—	—	—	—		Mamaru
"Star Baby"	2022	—	—	—	—	—		Black Butta
"Show Me That You Festive"	2022	—	—	—	—	—		Black Butta
"UK Grand Finale Megamix" (featuring the cast of RuPaul's Drag Race UK, Series 4)	2022	—	—	—	—	—		Non-album single
"A.S.M.R Lover" (featuring Skeltal Ki)	2022	—	—	—	—	—		Black Butta
"Cake & Candy"	2023	—	—	—	—	—		Black Butta
"—" denotes a recording that did not chart or was not released in that territory.

=== As featured artist ===
Title	Year	Peak chart positions				Album
Title	Year	US Elec.	US Dance	AUS	UK	Album
"It's Raining Men... The Sequel" (with Martha Wash)	1997	— (Note: "Snapshot" did not chart on the Dance/Electronic Songs Chart, but did peak at number 1 on the Dance Singles Sales Chart, a component chart that was later discontinued and merged into the Dance/Electronic Songs Chart)	22	64	21	The Collection
"Low (Remix)" (with Todrick Hall)	2017	35	—	—	—	Straight Outta Oz (Deluxe Edition)
"Dem Beats" (with Todrick Hall)	2018	—	55	—	—	Forbidden

=== Promotional singles ===
Single	Year	Album
"Can I Get an Amen?" (RuPaul featuring the cast of RuPaul's Drag Race Season 5)	2013	Non-album singles
"Oh No She Better Don't" (RuPaul featuring the cast of RuPaul's Drag Race Season 6)	2014	Non-album singles
"Divas Live"	2018	Non-album singles
"Sitting on a Secret" (featuring Chi Chi DeVayne, Morgan McMichaels, Thorgy Thor, Aja, & Milk)	2018	Non-album singles
"Drag Up Your Life" (featuring Trixie Mattel, Kennedy Davenport, BenDeLaCreme, Shangela, & BeBe Zahara Benet)	2018	Non-album singles
"PharmaRusical"	2018	Non-album singles
"Cher: The Unauthorized Rusical" (featuring the cast of RuPaul's Drag Race, Season 10)	2018	Non-album singles
"The Shady Bunch" (featuring the cast of RuPaul's Drag Race, Season 12)	2020	The Shady Bunch / Bring Back My Girls

== Guest appearances ==
Title	Year	Artist	Album
"Gagging on the Lovely Extravaganza"	1992	The Fabulous Pop Tarts	Gagging on the Lovely Extravaganza
"Everybody Say Love"	1993	Mitsou	Tempted
"Whatcha See Is Whatcha Get"	1994	None	Addams Family Values: Music from the Motion Picture
"I Will Survive"	1995	Diana Ross	Take Me Higher
"Free to Be"	1995	None	Wigstock: The Movie, Music From The Original Motion Picture
"Come"	1997	Martha Wash	The Collection
"Do the Right Thing (Don't Do Me Wrong)"	1999	Ev-Va	None
"Queer Duck"	1999	None	Queer Duck
"Super"	1999	None	South Park: Bigger, Longer & Uncut (soundtrack)
"Bad Girl"	2000	Lil' Kim	None
"Say My Name"	2001	The Disco Brothers	None
"You're No Lady"	2002	Gitta	None
"It's Only Rock 'n Roll (But I Like It)"	2003	Siedah Garrett	Siedah
"Electric Ecstacy"	2004	Eklektica	Outside the Box
"Come 2 Me"	2006	Lucy Lawless	Come 2 Me
"Computer Love"	2007	NSA	None
"This Club Is A Haunted House"	2013	Sharon Needles	PG-13
"Fashion!"	2013	Lady Gaga	Lady Gaga and the Muppets Holiday Spectacular
"Hands"	2016	Various Artists	—N/a
“Cattitude”	2019	Miley Cyrus	She Is Coming

== Music videos ==
=== As lead artist ===
Music video	Year	Artist	Director
"Supermodel (You Better Work)"	1993	RuPaul	Randy Barbato
"Back to My Roots"	1993	RuPaul	Randy Barbato
"A Shady Shade (Now Prance)"	1993	RuPaul	
"Little Drummer Boy"	1993	RuPaul	Fenton Bailey and Randy Barbato
"Don't Go Breaking My Heart"	1994	RuPaul with Elton John	Fenton Bailey and Randy Barbato
"Free to Be"	1995	RuPaul	
"Snapshot"	1996	RuPaul	
"A Little Bit of Love"	1997	RuPaul	Fenton Bailey and Randy Barbato
"Looking Good, Feeling Gorgeous"	2004	RuPaul	Mike Ruiz
"Workout"	2005	RuPaul	RuPaul and Danny Morris
"Call Me Starrbooty"	2007	RuPaul	
"Cover Girl" (Version 1)	2009	RuPaul	
"Cover Girl" (Version 2 with appearances by the top 3 of Drag Race Season 1)	2009	RuPaul feat. BeBe Zahara Benet	
"Jealous of My Boogie" (Version 1 with archive footage of Tommy Gunn)	2009	RuPaul	Justin Hurvitz and Steven Corfe
"Jealous of My Boogie" (Version 2 starring Chi Chi LaRue)	2009	RuPaul	
"Devil Made Me Do It"	2009	RuPaul	Mathu Andersen and Andrew Schneider
"Tranny Chaser"	2009	RuPaul	
"Jealous of My Boogie" (Version 3 with appearances by the top 3 of Drag Race Season 2)	2010	RuPaul	Mathu Andersen
"Champion" (with appearances by the top 3 of Drag Race Season 3)	2011	RuPaul	Mathu Andersen
"Glamazon" (with appearances by the top 3 of Drag Race Season 4)	2012	RuPaul	Mathu Andersen
"Responsitrannity" (feat. the cast of Drag Race All Stars Season 1)	2012	RuPaul	Nick Murray
"Peanut Butter"	2013	RuPaul feat. Big Freedia	Steven Corfe
"Can I Get an Amen?"	2013	RuPaul feat. The top 8 of Drag Race Season 5	
"The Beginning" (with appearances by the top 3 of Drag Race Season 5)	2013	RuPaul	Mathu Andersen
"Lick It Lollipop"	2013	RuPaul feat. Lady Bunny	Steven Corfe
"Geronimo"	2014	RuPaul feat. Lucian Piane	Steven Corfe
"Oh No She Better Don't"	2014	RuPaul & DJ Shy Boy feat. the cast of Drag Race Season 6	Steven Corfe
"Sissy That Walk" (with appearances by the top 4 of Drag Race Season 6)	2014	RuPaul	Steven Corfe
"Modern Love"	2015	RuPaul	Steven Corfe
"Born Naked (Stadium Remix)" (with appearances by the top 3 of Drag Race Season 7)	2015	Rupaul feat. Clairy Browne	
"Merry Christmas" (with appearances by The Pit Crew)	2015	RuPaul	
"You're the Star"	2015	RuPaul	
"Deck the Halls"	2015	RuPaul feat. Todrick Hall	
"Jingle Dem Bells"	2015	Rupaul feat. Big Freedia	
"From Your Heart"	2016	Rupaul feat. Michelle Visage	
"Be Someone (Jrob Club)"	2016	RuPaul feat. Taylor Dayne	
"The Realness" (with appearances by the top 3 of Drag Race Season 8)	2016	RuPaul feat. Eric Kupper	Jayson Whitmore
"Cha Cha Bitch (Ralphi Rosario Edit)"	2016	RuPaul feat. AB Soto	
"Mighty Love"	2019	RuPaul	
"Blame It on the Edit"	2021	RuPaul	Weston Allen
"Just Want They Want"	2021	RuPaul	
"Catwalk"	2021	RuPaul feat. Skeltal Ki	Weston Allen
"Smile"	2022	RuPaul	Chang Fuerte

=== As featured performer ===
Music video	Year	Artist	Director
"Love Shack"	1989	The B-52's	Adam Bernstein
"I Will Survive"	1996	Diana Ross	Marty Callner
"It's Raining Men... The Sequel"	1998	Martha Wash feat. RuPaul	Doug Carney
"Say My Name" (re-release)	2008	Disco Brothers feat. RuPaul	
"Low"	2017	Todrick Hall feat. RuPaul	Todrick Hall and Moorhead&Benson
"Dem Beats"	2018	Todrick Hall feat. RuPaul	
"You Need to Calm Down"	2019	Taylor Swift	Drew Kirsch and Taylor Swift
