= Essential, Vol. 3 =

Compilation album by RuPaul
- Released: January 5, 2024
- Length: 63:00
- Labels: RuCo, Inc

RuPaul chronology
Essential Christmas (2023)	Essential, Vol. 3 (2024)	Good Luck and Don’t F%k It Up (2025)

Essential, Vol. 3 is a compilation album by RuPaul, released on January 5, 2024. The album collects singles from RuPaul's recent discography alongside remixes of older tracks and previously unreleased songs from RuPaul's time as lead vocalist of the band Wee Wee Pole.

== Background and release ==
Of the inspiration behind the compilation album, RuPaul told People: "Full disclosure, I'm a fan of my own music... Essential, Vol. 3 is a collection of my favorite collaborations from the past 10 years. I've also included the first 3 songs I ever recorded with my band Wee Wee Pole in 1983 - streaming for the first time ever." He also noted that the inclusion of songs recorded 40 years prior to the album's release alongside his more recent music "makes for an interesting contrast".

Released to coincide with the premiere of the sixteenth season of RuPaul's Drag Race, Essential, Vol. 3 includes the runway song featured in the season, "Hustle That Cat". RuPaul performed the Giddy Up remix of "Lady Cowboy", also featured on the album, on the season's fourth episode as the musical guest on a parody of Saturday Night Live.

The album is the fourth in RuPaul's Essential series of compilation albums, following 2017's Remember Me: Essential, Vol. 1 and Essential, Vol. 2, and 2023's Essential Christmas.

== Track listing ==
No.	Title	Writer(s)	Original album	Length
1.	"Hustle That Cat"	Frederick Minano; RuPaul Charles	N/A	3:06
2.	"Devil Made Me Do It" (Fred Velvette remix)	Lucian Piane; Charles	Champion (2009)	2:13
3.	"Brand New Year" (featuring Siedah Garrett; JROB remix)	Ellis Miah; Erik Nuri; Charles; Garrett	Slay Belles (2015)	2:55
4.	"Feel Like Dancin'" (featuring La Toya Jackson; Matt Pop Reggaetoya remix)	Jeffre Phillips; Jackson; Piane; Charles	Born Naked (2014)	2:41
5.	"Lady Cowboy" (Giddy Up remix)	Mark Byers; Charles	American (2017)	2:25
6.	"I'm a Winner, Baby" (Skeltal Ki remix)	Jack Wilson; Lior Rosner; Charles	You're a Winner, Baby (2020)	2:57
7.	"Catwalk" (featuring Skeltal Ki)	Minano; Charles	Mamaru (2022)	2:56
8.	"Just What They Want"	Minano; Charles	Mamaru (2022)	3:13
9.	"Blame It on the Edit"	Minano; Charles	Mamaru (2022)	3:03
10.	"Call Me Mother"	Minano; Charles	American (2017)	3:21
11.	"Kitty Girl"	Byers; Charles	American (2017)	3:28
12.	"Mighty Love" (KUMMERSPECK remix)	Jimmy Harry; Charles	American (2017)	3:40
13.	"American"	Wilson; Rosner; Charles	American (2017)	3:05
14.	"Bring Back My Girls"	Wilson; Rosner; Charles	You're a Winner, Baby (2020)	2:43
15.	"Condragulations"	Wilson; Rosner; Charles	You're a Winner, Baby (2020)	3:25
16.	"Super Queen" (Runway remix)	Byers; Charles	Christmas Party (2018)	3:51
17.	"New Friends Silver, Old Friends Gold" (Matt Pop remix)	Minano; Charles	New Friends Silver, Old Friends Gold (2021)	3:38
18.	"Body Heat" (Wee Wee Pole 40th anniversary)	Brian Todd Butler; J David Klimchak; Robert Burke Warren; Charles	N/A	3:22
19.	"In My Neighborhood" (Wee Wee Pole 40th anniversary)	Butler; Klimchak; Warren; Charles	N/A	3:59
20.	"Tarzan" (Wee Wee Pole 40th anniversary)	Butler; Klimchak; Warren; Charles	N/A	3:36
Total length:				63:00

== See also ==
- RuPaul discography
