= RuPaul's Drag Race Holi-slay Spectacular =

- Hosted by: RuPaul
- Judges: RuPaul; Michelle Visage; Ross Mathews; Todrick Hall
- No. of contestants: 8
- Winners: Eureka O'Hara; Jasmine Masters; Kim Chi; Latrice Royale; Mayhem Miller; Shangela; Sonique; Trixie Mattel

Release
- Original network: VH1
- Original release: December 7, 2018

RuPaul's Drag Race Holi-slay Spectacular is a holiday television special, which aired on VH1 on December 7, 2018. The hour-long RuPaul's Drag Race special, announced on November 1, had former Drag Race contestants Eureka O'Hara, Jasmine Masters, Kim Chi, Latrice Royale, Mayhem Miller, Shangela, Sonique, and Trixie Mattel compete to become "Drag Race Christmas Queen".

The contestants had to lip-sync to holiday music by RuPaul, including tracks from Slay Belles (2015) and Christmas Party (2018), to choreography by Todrick Hall.

Jasmine Masters and Latrice Royale later competed in fourth season of RuPaul's Drag Race All Stars, which was previewed during the programme's airing and premiered one-week after the Holi-slay Spectacular and placing 10th and 5th, respectively.

Mayhem Miller later competed in fifth season of RuPaul's Drag Race All Stars, placing 7th.

Eureka O'Hara and Sonique later competed in sixth season of RuPaul's Drag Race All Stars, placing 2nd-4th and 1st, respectively.

== Contestants ==
Ages, names, and cities stated are at time of filming.

Contestants of RuPaul's Drag Race Holi-slay Spectacular and their backgrounds
Contestant	Age	Hometown	Original season(s)	Original placement(s)	Outcome
Eureka (Note: Eureka O'Hara is referred to as Eureka on the show.)	28	Johnson City, Tennessee	Season 9	11th place (Note: Eureka was removed from the competition due to injury.)	Winners
Eureka	28	Johnson City, Tennessee	Season 10	Runner-up	Winners
Jasmine Masters (Note: Jasmine Diane Masters is referred to as Jasmine Masters on the show.)	42	Los Angeles, California	Season 7	12th place	Winners
Kim Chi	30	Chicago, Illinois	Season 8	Runner-up	Winners
Latrice Royale	46	Hollywood, Florida	Season 4	4th place (Note: Latrice Royale was voted Miss Congeniality on her original season.)	Winners
Latrice Royale	46	Hollywood, Florida	All Stars 1	7th place	Winners
Mayhem Miller	36	Riverside, California	Season 10	10th place	Winners
Shangela (Note: Shangela Laquifa Wadley was referred to as her full name on season 2 and as Shangela on subsequent seasons.)	36	Los Angeles, California	Season 2	12th place	Winners
Shangela	36	Los Angeles, California	Season 3	6th place	Winners
Shangela	36	Los Angeles, California	All Stars 3	3rd place	Winners
Sonique (Note: Now Kylie Sonique Love, she was referred to as Sonique prior to All Stars 6.)	35	Atlanta, Georgia	Season 2	9th place	Winners
Trixie Mattel	29	Los Angeles, California	Season 7	6th place	Winners
Trixie Mattel	29	Los Angeles, California	All Stars 3	Winner	Winners

== Challenges ==
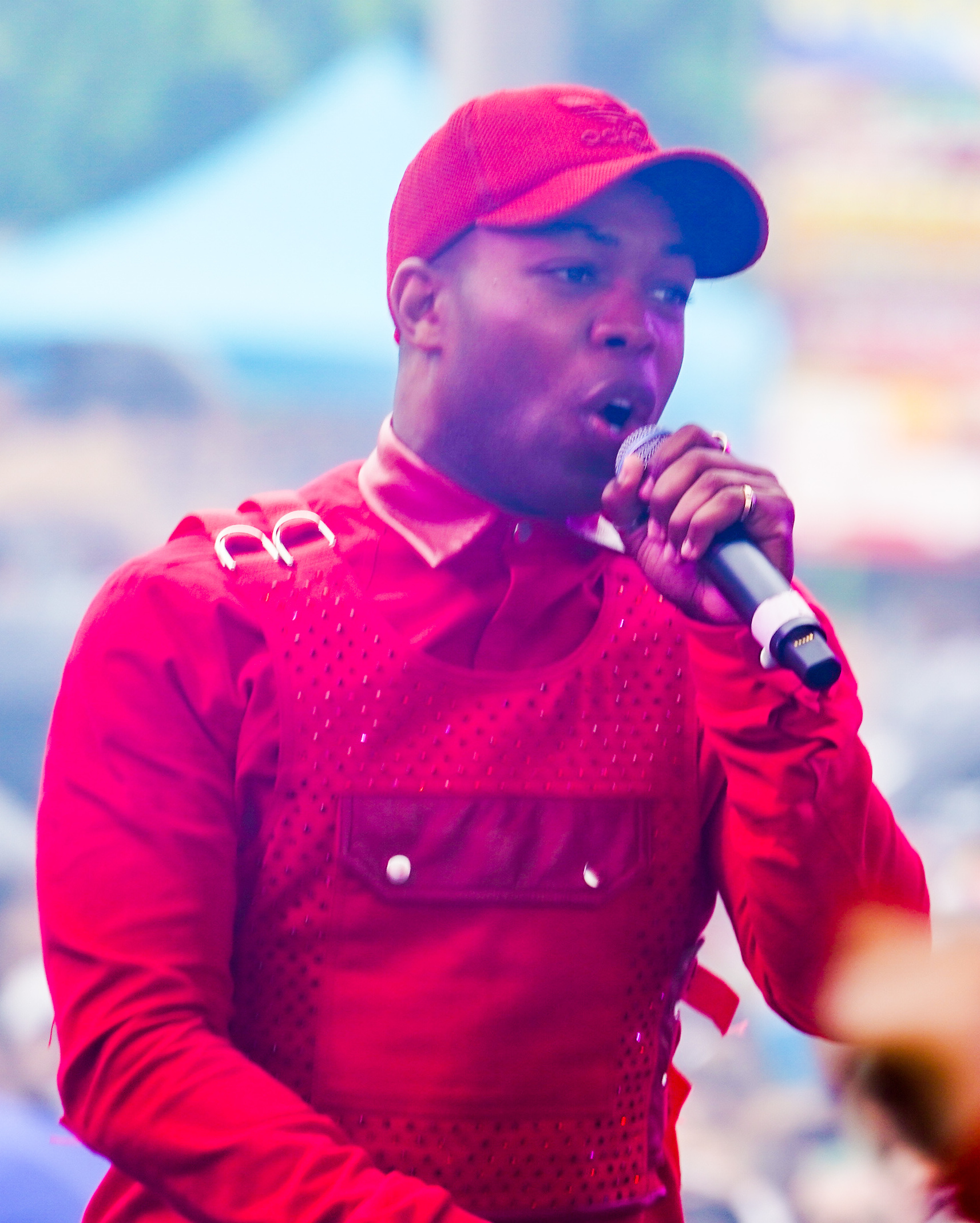
The contestants performed choreographed by Todrick Hall.

For the mini challenge, the queens were paired with a member of the pit crew to dance down the runway to "Christmas Cookies". Mayhem Miller won the mini challenge. The contestants then get ready for the main challenge to the beat of "My Favorite Holiday".

RuPaul performs "Hey Sis, It's Christmas" on the runway alongside the dancers. For the main challenge, the queens must lip sync to RuPaul's song "Get to You" in a 1980s-inspired costume, choreographed by Todrick Hall. The runway theme is "Non-denominational Christmas Eleganza Extravaganza".

All the queens lip-synced in pairs against one another: Mayhem Miller vs. Sonique, Jasmine Masters vs. Shangela, Eureka vs. Trixie Mattel and Kim Chi vs. Latrice Royale. RuPaul then declared all the contestants as the winners. At the end of the episode, Michelle Visage and RuPaul lip-synced for their lives to "Christmas Party"; the judging panel, consisting of the queens alongside Ross Mathews and Todrick Hall, declares a double save.

== Lip syncs ==
Contestants			Song
Mayhem Miller	vs.	Sonique	"Merry Christmas, Mary!" (RuPaul)
Jasmine Masters	vs.	Shangela	"Jingle Dem Bells" (RuPaul ft. Big Freedia)
Eureka	vs.	Trixie Mattel	"Deck the Halls" (RuPaul ft. Todrick Hall)
Latrice Royale	vs.	Kim Chi	"Brand New Year" (RuPaul ft. Siedah Garrett)
Michelle Visage	vs.	RuPaul	"Christmas Party" (RuPaul ft. Michelle Visage)

== Reception ==
The program received mixed reviews as many expected a typical episode, when it was actually a promo tool for RuPaul's new Christmas album, Christmas Party. Variety said "the special quickly pulls a bait and switch, becoming both much sneakier and way less interesting than its festive first impression", calling out RuPaul's promo plug for the album. The A.V. Club gave it a C+ and stated that, despite the flaws, the episode was not without its charm, but still criticised the promotional aspect for RuPaul's Christmas album. Bustle praised the program, saying "it took a turn for the delightfully cheesy, as most holiday specials are wont to do. Its aim quickly became not to pit queens against one another, but of course, to spread Christmas cheer, all while donning their gay apparel in its most literal form", noting it was a welcomed departure from the show's origins. TV Line also praised it and highlighted the looks of Eureka, Mayhem, Trixie and Shangela. In an interview with Entertainment Weekly, Sonique also praised her fellow contestant, Mayhem. USA Today concluded by saying "So if you want to see some spectacular holiday looks from your favorite queens mixed with some fun and festive beats, you don't want to Christ-miss this! Just don't expect to be on the edge of your seat."

=== Ratings ===
Viewership and ratings per episode of RuPaul's Drag Race Holi-slay Spectacular
No.	Title	Air date	Rating/share (18–49)	Viewers (millions)
1	"RuPaul's Drag Race Holi-slay Spectacular"	December 7, 2018	0.18	0.44
