= All Alone on Christmas =

Single by Darlene Love

from the album Home Alone 2: Lost in New York – Original Soundtrack Album
- Released: December 4, 1992
- Studio: Power Station, New York City
- Genre: Christmas; R&B; rock and roll
- Length: 4:14
- Label: Fox; Arista; BMG
- Songwriter: Steve Van Zandt
- Producer: Steve Van Zandt

"All Alone on Christmas" is a song written and arranged by Steve Van Zandt, and recorded by Darlene Love with members of both The E Street Band and The Miami Horns. It was originally featured on the soundtrack of Home Alone 2: Lost in New York. It was also released as a 7-inch single and a CD single which included an instrumental version.

The song returned Love's name to the music singles charts, peaking at No. 83 on the U.S. Billboard Hot 100 singles chart, No. 31 on the official UK Singles Chart. and No. 145 on the Australian ARIA Charts.

The third track on the single was a Christmas remix of The Capitols "Cool Jerk" which was also taken from the same film soundtrack. The single was influenced by Phil Spector's Wall of Sound and is recorded in the style of the Spector-produced Love song "Christmas (Baby Please Come Home)," which is referenced in the song. The single featured a promotional photo of Love with the five members of the E Street Band who featured on the track. A promotional video featured Macaulay Culkin "producing" as Love performed the song with The E Street Band and The Miami Horns, and it features clips from Home Alone 2: Lost in New York. The song was also featured in the films Love Actually, The Night Before and in the 2001 Italian film Merry Christmas.

== Other versions and covers ==
- During the first year of her run in the Broadway musical Hairspray, Love re-recorded "All Alone on Christmas" using the show's cast and band as backup on the charity recording Broadway's Greatest Gifts: Carols for A Cure Vol. 7.
- The song was covered by RuPaul for his 1997 Christmas album entitled Ho, Ho, Ho.
- Dream pop band Work Drugs released a cover of the song in late 2016.
- Boy Jumps Ship released a cover of the song in December 2016 along with a video that includes re-enacted scenes from Home Alone by members of the band. Proceeds from the song are donated to mental health charity MIND.

== Personnel ==
Musicians

- Darlene Love – lead vocals
- The E Street Band
  - Clarence Clemons – tenor sax solo
  - Danny Federici – keyboards
  - Garry Tallent – bass guitar
  - Steven Van Zandt – guitars
  - Patti Scialfa – backing vocals
  - Max Weinberg – drums
- The Miami Horns
  - Mark Pender – trumpet
  - Rick Gazda – trumpet
  - Stan Harrison – tenor sax
  - Richie "La Bamba" Rosenberg – trombone
  - Eddie Manion – baritone sax
  - Arno Hecht – alto sax
- Pat Thrall – guitars
- Mark Alexander – piano
- Isabella Lento – backing vocals
- Carmela Lento – backing vocals
- Zoë Yanakis – percussion
- Benjamin Newberry – chimes

Production

- Steve Van Zandt – producer, arranger
- Zoë Yanakis – associate producer
- Ben Fowler – recording and mixing
- Dave McNair and Dan Gellert – additional recording
- Scott Hull – editing at Masterdisk
- Greg Calbi – mastered at Sterling Sound

== Charts ==
Chart performance for "All Alone on Christmas"
Chart (1992–2025)	Peak position
Austria (Ö3 Austria Top 40)	56
Germany (GfK)	55
Netherlands (Single Top 100)	91
UK Singles (Official Charts)	31
US Billboard Hot 100	83

== Certifications ==
Region	Certification	Certified units/sales
United Kingdom (BPI)	Silver	200,000^{‡}
^{‡} Sales+streaming figures based on certification alone.
