= Foxy Lady (RuPaul album) =

Studio album by RuPaul
- Released: October 29, 1996
- Recorded: 1996
- Genre: Dance-pop; house
- Length: 45:43
- Label: Rhino
- Producer: Joe Carrano; Richard "Humpty" Vission; Fenton Bailey; Randy Barbato; Eric Kupper; Jimmy Harry; Bruce Weeden; Scott Alspach; Eddie Montilla; Joe Carrano; Nick Martinelli; RuPaul

RuPaul chronology
Supermodel of the World (1993)	Foxy Lady (1996)	Ho Ho Ho (1997)

Singles from Foxy Lady
- 1. "Snapshot" Released: October 16, 1996; 2. "A Little Bit of Love" Released: February 25, 1997; 3. "Celebrate" Released: 1997

Foxy Lady is the second studio album by American singer and drag queen RuPaul. It was released on October 29, 1996, by Rhino Records. It is the follow-up to RuPaul's critically and commercially successful 1993 album Supermodel of the World. Foxy Lady explores similar genres to those of his first album, including dance and house.

Professional ratings
Review scores
Source	Rating
AllMusic	3/5 stars
Billboard	(favorable)
Entertainment Weekly	B

== Album information ==
Despite the huge success of Supermodel of the World, Foxy Lady failed to chart on the Billboard 200 despite reaching #15 on the Billboard Heatseakers chart and producing two mildly successful singles. Its first single "Snapshot" reached #95 on the Billboard Hot 100, #4 on the Billboard Dance Music/Club Play Singles, and #10 on the Billboard Hot Dance Music. The next single "A Little Bit of Love" reached #28 on the Billboard Dance Music/Club Play Singles. The single's music video depicted RuPaul along with female impersonator Jazzmun and transgender cabaret performer Candis Cayne as aliens out to conquer the world. The video received a GLAAD Media Award nomination for Best Video of 1998. The clip, directed by Randy Barbato and Fenton Bailey, was in included on RuPaul's Work It Girl compilation DVD.

== Reception ==
Foxy Lady received generally positive reviews upon release in November 1996. Billboard said it "offers a glimpse into a soulful stylist who needs to be heard far more frequently in the future". Stephen Thomas Erlewine from AllMusic said "Foxy Lady was an attempt to expand RuPaul's pop culture phenomenon status into a genuine career, and it didn't quite succeed. Although RuPaul is supported by a number of fine producers who help give the album a sleek, attractive sound, the record lacks a song as catchy or kitschy as 'Supermodel,' which ironically makes it a bit of a faceless album." Alanna Nash critiqued the album for Stereo Review and faulted a disco-beat-heavy production, which she theorized was perhaps the result of its several producers. "Foxy Lady often sounds like the rumblings of a bank of overheated computers," Nash opined.

== Track listing ==
No.	Title	Writer(s)	Producer(s)	Length
1.	"Happy"	RuPaul; Peter Lorimer; Richard "Humpty" Vission	Lorimer; Vission	4:43
2.	"Party Train"	RuPaul; Joe Carrano	Welcome; Carrano	3:29
3.	"A Little Bit of Love"	RuPaul; Carrano	Welcome; Carrano	3:55
4.	"Snapshot"	RuPaul; Eric Kupper	Kupper	3:03
5.	"Foxy Lady"	RuPaul; Jimmy Harry	Harry	2:56
6.	"R. U Nasty"	RuPaul; Michael O Hara; Nick Martinelli; Bruce Weeden	Martinelli; Weeden	4:07
7.	"Falling"	RuPaul; Harry; Martinelli	Martinelli	4:12
8.	"Dolores"	RuPaul; Montilla; Martinelli	Martinelli; Montilla	4:09
9.	"Work That Body"	Diana Ross; Paul Jabara; Raymond Chew	Kupper	3:42
10.	"Celebrate"	RuPaul; Pete Lorimer; Vission	Lorimer; Vission	4:48
11.	"Snatched for the Gods"	RuPaul; Kupper	Kupper	3:56
12.	"If You Were a Woman and I Was a Man"	Desmond Child	Jimmy Harry	3:13

Japanese bonus tracks
No.	Title	Writer(s)	Producer(s)	Length
13.	"Snapshot" (Welcome's Moody Radio Edit)	RuPaul; Kupper	Kupper	3:24
14.	"Snapshot" (Vission & Lorimer Disco-Tech)	RuPaul; Kupper	Kupper	6:22
15.	"Snapshot" (Kupper's Extended Version)	RuPaul; Kupper	Kupper	5:25

== Chart positions ==
Chart (1996)	Peak position
US Top Heatseekers	15

== Credits ==
- RuPaul — vocals
- Pete Lorimer Arranger — producer
- Richard "Humpty" Vission — arranger, producer
- Rachel Gutek Art Direction — design
- Diana Germano — assistant engineer
- Jason Perez — assistant engineer
- Charles Barwick — engineer
- Fenton Bailey — executive producer
- Randy Barbato — executive producer
- Jay Mitchell — guitar
- Mathu Anderson — hair stylist
- Geoff Sykes — mastering
- Albert Sanchez — photography
- Eric Kupper — producer, engineer
- Jimmy Harry — producer, mixing
- Joe Wolfe — programming, engineer, mixing
- Bruce Weeden — programming, producer, engineer, mixing
- Scott Alspach — programming, producer
- Eddie Montilla — programming, producer
- Joe Carrano — background vocals, programming, producer, engineer, mixing
- L'Wren Scott — stylist
- Nick Martinelli — background vocals, producer
- Kelly Bienvenue — background vocals
- Alex Brown — background vocals
- Jackie Gouchee Farris — background vocals
- Guy A. Fortt — background vocals
- Lee Genesis — background vocals
- Connie Harvey — background vocals
- Fabio Hoyos — background vocals
- Robbie Jenkins — background vocals
- Mariachi Aguila Real — background vocals
- Phyllis Miller — background vocals
- Britt Savage — background vocals
- Latasha Spencer — background vocals
- Tony Warren — background vocals
- Therese Willis — background vocals
- Yolanda Wyns — background vocals
