= Black Butta =

2023 album by RuPaul

Studio album by RuPaul
- Released: January 6, 2023
- Length: 31:51
- Label: RuCo

RuPaul chronology
Mamaru (2022)	Black Butta (2023)	Essential Christmas (2023)

Singles from Black Butta
- 1. "Star Baby" Released: November 4, 2022; 2. "Show Me That You Festive" Released: November 4, 2022; 3. "A.S.M.R Lover" Released: December 23, 2022; 4. "Cake & Candy" Released: January 6, 2023

Black Butta is the fifteenth studio album by RuPaul, released on January 6, 2023. The album features guest appearances by Skeltal Ki and Eric Kupper, with the songs "Star Baby" and "Show Me That You Festive" released as the lead singles in November 2022.

== Promotion ==
"Star Baby" and "Show Me That You Festive" were released as singles on November 4, 2022.

== Reception ==
Metro Weekly rated the album two out of five stars and said it "struggles to argue for its own existence". The magazine also included Black Butta in a list of five "must-hear" gay albums in January 2023.

== Track listing ==
All tracks are written by RuPaul Charles and Frederick Minano.

Black Butta track listing
No.	Title	Length
1.	"A.S.M.R Lover" (featuring Skeltal Ki)	2:54
2.	"Cake & Candy"	2:42
3.	"Suga Daddy"	2:53
4.	"Pink Limousine"	3:14
5.	"Courage to Love"	5:21
6.	"Show Me That You Festive"	2:44
7.	"Black Butta"	2:26
8.	"Everytime a Heartbeats"	3:21
9.	"Star Baby"	2:23
10.	"Courage to Love" (featuring Eric Kupper)	5:21
