= Workout (RuPaul song) =

"WorkOut"

Single by RuPaul

from the album Red Hot
- Released: 2005
- Recorded: 2004
- Genre: Dance; house; electro; hip house
- Length: 3:56 (album version)
- Label: RuCo, Inc.
- Songwriters: Eric Kupper; Frankie Knuckles; Robert Brown; John Madden Jr.
- Producers: RuPaul Charles; Darrell Martin; Omri Anghel

RuPaul singles chronology
"Looking Good, Feeling Gorgeous" (2004)	"WorkOut" (2005)	"People Are People" (2006)

"WorkOut" is the second single from RuPaul's album Red Hot. The song is a dance/house song about feeling liberated while dancing. The expression "work out" is (not exclusively) gay slang for expressing one's self exuberantly; it is similar to RuPaul's coined phrase "You better work!". Two versions of the single were made available; one version, with 8 tracks, was released by RuPaul on his own RuCo, Inc. label. The other version, a 3 track version released only in Germany, was released on the Dance Street label.

== Music video ==
The music video was catered to club play and features a montage of RuPaul in different outfits singing the song in locations such as a rooftop and a dance club.

== Track listings ==
- WorkOut (The RuMixes) (Ruco, Inc. Single)
1. WorkOut (Blueroom Radio) – 3:30
2. WorkOut (Junior's Spirit Club) – 7:51
3. WorkOut (Eric Kupper Dub) – 7:52
4. WorkOut (Blueroom Mix Show) – 7:22
5. WorkOut (Junior's NYC Radio) – 3:39
6. WorkOut (Joe Carrano's Ragged Radio) – 3:31
7. WorkOut (Junior's Club Dub) – 6:55
8. Looking Good, Feeling Gorgeous (D1 Music ReDux) – 4:39
- German Single
1. WorkOut (Joe Carrano's Ragged Radio)
2. WorkOut (Junior's Spirit Club)
3. Looking Good, Feeling Gorgeous (Looking Good Feeling Gomi Mix)

== Credits and personnel ==
- RuPaul – lead vocals, producer
- Omri Anghel – producer
- Robert Brown – songwriter
- Sharlotte Gibson – background vocals
- Frankie Knuckles – songwriter
- Eric Kupper – songwriter
- John Madden Jr. – songwriter
- Darrell Martin – producer, background vocals
- Tom Trujillo – background vocals

== Chart performance ==
Chart (2005)	Peak position
US Dance Club Songs (Billboard)	5
