= Red Hot (album) =

Studio album by RuPaul
- Released: September 21, 2004
- Genres: House; pop; club; dance; R&B
- Length: 47:55
- Labels: RuCo, Inc.
- Producers: RuPaul Charles; Tom Trujillo; Derek Brin; Chris Rosa; Joe Carrano; Darrell Martin; Assaf Amdursky; Omri Anghel; D' Vinci; Lior Rossner

RuPaul chronology
Ho Ho Ho (1997)	Red Hot (2004)	Champion (2009)

Singles from Red Hot
- 1. "Looking Good, Feeling Gorgeous" Released: 2004; 2. "WorkOut" Released: 2005; 3. "People Are People" Released: 2006

Professional ratings
Review scores
Source	Rating
About.com	4/5 stars
Allmusic	3/5 stars

Red Hot is RuPaul's fourth official album release. Red Hot consists of a mixture of house, pop, club/dance and R&B songs. It includes the three Top 10 Hot Dance Music/Club Play chart hits, "Looking Good, Feeling Gorgeous", "Workout", and "People Are People". It is RuPaul's first album released under his own independent record label RuCo, Inc.

== Track listing ==
Standard Edition
No.	Title	Writer(s)	Producer(s)	Length
1.	"Shirley Q. Liquor & Watusi Jenkins"			0:37
2.	"Looking Good, Feeling Gorgeous"	Darrell Martin, Craig Peterson, Assaf Amdursky, William Brown	Darrell Martin, Assaf Amdursky	3:05
3.	"Coming Out of Hiding"	RuPaul Charles, Tom Trujillo	RuPaul Charles, Chris Rosa, Tom Trujillo (co.)	3:05
4.	"Shirley Q. Intro"			0:20
5.	"Are You Man Enough? / Orange Wig Skit"	Charles, Siedah Garrett, Derek Brin	Derek Brin, RuPaul Charles (co.)	4:04
6.	"Kinky/Freaky"	Charles, Marlaina Kemp, Brin	Derek Brin, RuPaul Charles (co.)	3:58
7.	"Love Is Love"	Charles, Sami McKinney	RuPaul Charles, Chris Rosa, Tom Trujillo (co.)	3:01
8.	"Just a Little In & Out"	Charles, Kristine Weitz	RuPaul Charles, D' Vinci, Tom Trujillo (co.)	3:12
9.	"WorkOut / Betta Work Skit"	Eric Kupper, Frankie Knuckles, Robert Brown, John Madden Jr.	RuPaul Charles, Darrell Martin, Omri Anghel	3:56
10.	"The Price of One"	Charles, Trujillo, Jimmy Harry	RuPaul Charles, Chris Rosa, Tom Trujillo (co.)	3:22
11.	"I Need More"	Charles, McKinney, Kemp, Brin	Derek Brin, RuPaul Charles (co.)	3:08
12.	"People Are People / Sheepy Skit" (featuring Tom Trujillo)	Martin Gore	RuPaul Charles, Chris Rosa, Tom Trujillo (co.)	4:16
13.	"My Love Sees No Color"	Charles, Trujillo	RuPaul Charles, Joe Carrano, Tom Trujillo (co.)	4:16
14.	"Hollywood U.S.A."	Charles, Trujillo	RuPaul Charles, Joe Carrano, Tom Trujillo (co.)	3:34
15.	"Give It One More Try"	Charles, Trujillo	RuPaul Charles, Lior Rossner, Tom Trujillo (co.)	3:17
16.	"Superman"	Charles, Garrett, Brin	Derek Brin, RuPaul Charles (co.)	3:18

European edition bonus tracks
No.	Title	Length
17.	"Looking Good, Feeling Gorgeous" (D1 Music Redux)
18.	"Workout" (Blueroom Radio)
19.	"Looking Good, Feeling Gorgeous" (music video)

- (co.) signifies a co-producer.

== Chart positions ==
Chart (2004)	Peak position
U.S. Billboard Top Electronic Albums	9
