= Mirror Mirror (Diana Ross song) =

"Mirror, Mirror"

Single by Diana Ross

from the album Why Do Fools Fall in Love
- B-side: "Sweet Nothings"
- Released: December 11, 1981
- Recorded: 1981
- Genre: R&B; pop; post-disco
- Length: 6:08 (album version); 3:59 (single version)
- Label: RCA
- Songwriters: Dennis Matkosky; Michael Sembello
- Producer: Diana Ross

Diana Ross singles chronology
"Why Do Fools Fall in Love" (1981)	"Mirror, Mirror" (1981)	"Work That Body" (1982)

Music video
- "Mirror Mirror" on YouTube

"Mirror, Mirror" is a song by American singer Diana Ross. Written by Dennis Matkosky and Michael Sembello, and produced by Ross, the song was released as the second single from her Platinum-certified album Why Do Fools Fall in Love on December 11, 1981, by RCA Records.

== Background ==
The song talks of a love lost that the singer was going through and her deliberately asking herself while looking in the mirror why she allowed the love "to fall" apart, referencing the Wicked Queen's chant to the Magic Mirror in Snow White and the Seven Dwarfs: "Mirror, mirror on the wall". "Mirror Mirror" is also notable as one of the few songs that Ross sung both lead and background vocals.

== Music video ==
The accompanying music video for "Mirror Mirror" was played on BET, but was rejected by MTV. It showcases Ross lip-synching the song and during the break, she dances with the video dividing her in double vision as she spins around. Despite the rudimentary production values, it was an early BET favorite. However, it was conspicuously left off of her VHS, and later DVD, compilation Visions of Diana Ross.

== Personnel ==
- Diana Ross − lead vocals, backing vocals, producer
- Michael Brecker − tenor saxophone
- Randy Brecker − horn arrangements
- Ray Chew − musical arrangements, acoustic piano
- Eric Gale − rhythm guitar
- Yogi Horton − drums
- Neil Jason − bass
- Ralph MacDonald − percussion
- Jeff Mironov − rhythm guitar
- Ted Jensen at Sterling Sound, New York City − mastering
- Bob Kulick − lead guitar

== Charts ==
"Mirror Mirror" reached number eight on the main US Billboard Hot 100 chart and reached number two on the US Billboard soul chart.

=== Weekly charts ===
Chart (1981–1982)	Peak position
Belgium (Ultratop 50 Flanders)	22
Canada Top Singles (RPM)	29
Finland (Suomen virallinen lista)	24
Netherlands (Dutch Top 40)	27
Netherlands (Single Top 100)	24
New Zealand (Recorded Music NZ)	15
UK Singles (OCC)	36
US Billboard Hot 100	8
US Hot R&B/Hip-Hop Songs (Billboard)	2
US Dance Club Songs (Billboard)	14
US Cash Box Top 100	7

=== Year-end charts ===
Chart (1982)	Position
US Top Pop Singles (Billboard)	86

== Live performances ==
- "Mirror Mirror" was performed during Diana Ross' live concert in front of 800,000 people, Diana Ross Live in Central Park.
- "Mirror Mirror" was performed on her 2010 concert tour. It was the first time it was performed in over 15 years.
- "Mirror Mirror" debuted live on The Tonight Show Starring Johnny Carson (1981)
