= Remember Me: Essential, Vol. 1 =

Remix album by RuPaul
- Released: February 3, 2017
- Genre: Dance
- Length: 40:18
- Label: RuCo Inc.
- Producers: Kummerspeck; Ellis Miah; Skeltal Ki; Vjuan Allure; YLXR; Macutchi; Matt Pop

RuPaul chronology
Butch Queen (2016)	Remember Me: Essential, Vol. 1 (2017)	American (2017)

Singles from Remember Me - Essential, Vol. 1
- 1. "Snapshot" Released: February 16, 2017; 2. "Rock It (To the Moon)" Released: November 21, 2019; 3. "A Little Bit of Love" Released: March 18, 2021

Remember Me: Essential, Vol. 1 is a remix album and greatest hits album by American singer and drag queen RuPaul, released on February 3, 2017. It features remixed versions of some of his older songs as well as new ones that were recorded for previous albums but never released.

== Background and composition ==
When asked whether Remember Me is a remix album or a greatest hits compilation, RuPaul said, "It's all of the above. These are songs that I've revisited from my early career, and re-imagined them and re-performed them. Yeah, that's really what it is. I don't know if there's even a genre for that, but it is everything you said and more”.

The album features remixes of songs originally produced between 1993 and 2007 (from Supermodel of the World through the Starrbooty soundtrack), including some previously unreleased material. "Mighty Love" was written and recorded as a demo, but never released, while "Rock It (To the Moon)" reworks a song from Starrbooty.

== Promotion ==
"Rock It (To the Moon)" was featured in promotional material for the ninth season of RuPaul's Drag Race. The remix of "Snapshot" was paired with a compilation of Ru's runway looks for a music video released February 16, 2017 by World of Wonder.

== Track listing ==
No.	Title	Writer(s)	Length
1.	"Rock It (To the Moon)" (featuring Kummerspeck)	RuPaul Charles	2:48
2.	"Just a Lil In and Out" (featuring Ellis Miah)	Charles; Kristine Weitz	3:55
3.	"Remember Me / Back to My Roots Medley" (featuring Skeltal Ki)	Charles; Jimmy Harry; Eric Kupper; Fredrick Minãno	3:36
4.	"Supermodel" (featuring Skeltal Ki)	Charles; Harry; Larry Tee; Lawrence Thom	3:16
5.	"A Shade Shady (Now Prance)" (featuring Vjuan Allure)	Charles; Kupper	3:16
6.	"Free 2 Be" (featuring Skeltal Ki and Chris Willis)	Charles; Harry	3:52
7.	"Call Me Starrbooty" (featuring YLXR)	Charles; Harry	2:28
8.	"A Little Bit of Love" (featuring Kummerspeck)	Charles; Joe Carrano	3:49
9.	"Snapshot" (featuring Macutchi)	Charles; Kupper	3:26
10.	"Do the Right Thing" (featuring YLXR)	Charles; Harry	3:22
11.	"House of Love" (featuring Matt Pop and Ellis Miah)	Charles; Harry	3:43
12.	"Mighty Love" (featuring Matt Pop)	Charles; Harry	3:29
Total length:			40:18

== Chart performance ==
Chart (2017)	Peak position
US Billboard Independent Albums	44
