= Essential Christmas =

2023 album by RuPaul

Compilation album by RuPaul
- Released: October 20, 2023
- Genre: Christmas
- Length: 37:32
- Label: RuCo

RuPaul chronology
Black Butta (2023)	Essential Christmas (2023)	Essential, Vol. 3 (2024)

Essential Christmas is a holiday album by RuPaul, released in 2023. The album is a compilation of tracks from previous Christmas projects, plus a new song called "Baby Doll".

== Composition ==
"Brand New Year" previously appeared on RuPaul's album Slay Belles (2015). Stephen Daw of Billboard called "Baby Doll" a "doo-wop jam".

"From Your Heart", which features Michelle Visage, "Merry Christmas, Mary", and "You're the Star" also appeared on Slay Belles previously.

== Track listing ==
Adapted from Tidal.

No.	Title	Writer(s)	Length
1.	"Brand New Year" (featuring Siedah Garrett) (Matt Pop Edit)	Ellis Miah; Rupaul Charles; Garrett	3:40
2.	"Baby Doll"	Frederick Mināno; Charles	2:10
3.	"I Just Can't Wait ('Til Christmas)"	Charles	2:39
4.	"Show Me That You Festive"	Mināno; Charles	2:43
5.	"From Your Heart" (featuring Michelle Visage)	Miah; Michelle Case; Charles	3:11
6.	"Merry Christmas, Mary"	Miah; Charles	2:57
7.	"You're the Star (On My Christmas Tree)"	Lucian Piane; Charles	2:23
8.	"Get to You (For Christmas)" (featuring Markaholic)	Mark Parkhurst Byers; Charles	3:26
9.	"Hey Sis, It's Christmas" (featuring Markaholic)	Byers; Charles	3:12
10.	"My Favourite Holiday" (Matt Pop Edit)	Byers; Charles	3:27
11.	"Christmas Party"	Byers; Charles	3:45
12.	"Jingle Dem Bells" (featuring Big Freedia & Ellis Miah)	Miah; Freddie Ross Jr.; Charles	2:59
Total length:			37:32
