= Work That Body (song) =

Single by Diana Ross

from the album Why Do Fools Fall in Love
- B-side: "Two Can Make It"
- Released: March 19, 1982
- Recorded: 1981
- Studio: Power Station, New York
- Genre: Dance-pop; post-disco
- Length: 4:57
- Label: RCA (USA); Capitol (World)
- Songwriters: Diana Ross; Paul Jabara; Ray Chew
- Producers: Ray Chew; Diana Ross

Diana Ross singles chronology
"Mirror Mirror" (1981)	"Work That Body" (1982)	"It's Never Too Late" (1982)

Music video
- "Work That Body" on YouTube

"Work That Body" is a song by American singer Diana Ross recorded for her eleventh studio album Why Do Fools Fall in Love (1981). The song was written by Ross (her first written song), and producers Paul Jabara and Ray Chew. The song was written during the popularity of aerobics classes.

It was released as the third single from the album on March 19, 1982 by RCA Records with the song "Two Can Make It" on the flip side (words and music by Dean Pitchford and Tom Snow). Immediately after its release, it rose to the 14th position of the Billboard's Dance chart (along with "Mirror Mirror"), although it reached only the 44th position on the Billboard Hot 100, it reached the 34th position on the Hot Black Singles; however, Cash Box magazine's R&B chart reflected a much higher popularity, peaking at #12. In the UK, the song became a big hit, rising to 7th position.

== Critical reception ==
A reviewer of Record Mirror stated that this is a healthy, energetic product, ideal for Jane Fonda-style workouts. Rolling Stone called the song "an exciting piece of artistic dance music", and Billboard praised "one of the grittiest vocals in [Ross'] career" and suggested that "listeners will probably be burning a hole in through the floor with their feet".

== Track listing ==
7" / 12" single
A. "Work That Body" – 4:57
B. "Two Can Make It" – 3:23

7" single
A. "Work That Body" – 3:29
B. "Two Can Make It" – 3:23

12" maxi-single
A. "Work That Body" (12" Mix) – 6:32
B. "Two Can Make It" – 3:23

12" single
A. "Work That Body" (Extended Remix) – 6:21
B. "Two Can Make It" – 3:23

== Personnel ==
- Diana Ross – lead vocals, backing vocals
- Ray Chew – acoustic piano, arrangements
- Jeff Mironov – electric guitar
- Neil Jason – bass
- Yogi Horton – drums
- Ralph MacDonald – percussion
- Margaret Dorn – backing vocals
- Leata Galloway – backing vocals
- Millie Whiteside – backing vocals

== Charts ==
Chart performance for "Work That Body"
Chart (1982)	Peak position
Belgium (Ultratop 50 Flanders)	19
Finland (Suomen virallinen lista)	10
Ireland (IRMA)	10
Luxembourg (Radio Luxembourg)	3
Netherlands (Dutch Top 40)	16
Netherlands (Single Top 100)	15
UK Singles (OCC)	7
US Billboard Hot 100	44
US Dance Club Songs (Billboard)	14
US Hot R&B/Hip-Hop Songs (Billboard)	34
US Cash Box Top 100	41

== Cover versions ==
- American artist RuPaul recorded a cover version of the song for his album Foxy Lady (1996).
- English singer songwriter Melanie C sampled the song for her single, "Sweat" (2025).
