= Butch Queen =

Studio album by RuPaul
- Released: March 4, 2016
- Genres: Dance, deep house
- Label: RuCo Inc.

RuPaul chronology
Slay Belles (2015)	Butch Queen (2016)	Remember Me: Essential, Vol. 1 (2017)

Singles from Butch Queen
- 1. "U Wear It Well" Released: 29 February 2016; 2. "Be Someone" Released: 15 April 2016; 3. "Category Is..." Released: 9 June 2017

Butch Queen is the tenth studio album from singer and drag queen RuPaul. It was released on March 4, 2016, just three days prior to the eighth season premiere of RuPaul's Drag Race. The album features guest appearances from Ellis Miah, Ts Madison and Taylor Dayne, among others.

== Background ==
A song on the album, "U Wear It Well" was first used in the promotional campaign for season eight of RuPaul's Drag Race in February 2016, which premiered during the 2016 NewNowNext Awards on Logo TV. On February 17, 2016, RuPaul tweeted "GAGGING on duet w/@taylor_dayne from my NEW album "Butch Queen" coming March 7, 2016!", confirming the release of his tenth album. It marks his third album to be released with a premiere of a season of RuPaul's Drag Race, after Born Naked (2014) and Realness (2015).

== Singles ==
The first song to be lifted from the album was "U Wear It Well" which was first heard in the teaser campaign for season eight of RuPaul's Drag Race. It was subsequently made available to download on February 29, 2016. A music video was released the following day on World of Wonder's YouTube channel featuring every runway look worn by RuPaul over the last seven seasons of RuPaul's Drag Race.

In 2020, "U Wear It Well" was used as the "rumix" song for the final challenge in Canada's Drag Race. The "Queens of the North Ru-mix" was released to streaming platforms and online music stores in September 2020.

== Track listing ==
All tracks are written by RuPaul, unless otherwise noted.

No.	Title	Writer(s)	Length
1.	"Cha Cha Bitch" (featuring AB Soto)	Soto	3:33
2.	"U Wear It Well"		2:58
3.	"Category Is..." (featuring Vjuan Allure)		3:52
4.	"Legends" (featuring Margo Thunder and Ellis Miah)		3:32
5.	"Feel Like a Woman" (featuring Vjuan Allure)		3:46
6.	"Drop" (featuring Ts Madison and Ellis Miah)		3:00
7.	"Drag Queen Honey" (featuring Vjuan Allure)		4:18
8.	"Be Someone" (featuring Taylor Dayne)		3:40
9.	"How I Wanna Hold U" (featuring Sharlotte Gibson and Matt Moss)		3:07
10.	"High Fashion Labels" (featuring Vjuan Allure)		3:47
11.	"Sister Brother" (featuring Margo Thunder)		4:46
12.	"Nothing Nice" (featuring Vjuan Allure)		3:16

== Chart performance ==
Chart (2016)	Peak position
US Billboard Dance/Electronic Albums	3
US Billboard Independent Albums	46

== Release history ==
Region	Date	Label	Format	Edition
Worldwide	March 4, 2016	RuCo Inc.	Digital download	Standard
Worldwide	April 15, 2016	RuCo Inc.	Digital download	Remixes
