= Why Do Fools Fall in Love (album) =

Studio album by Diana Ross
- Released: September 14, 1981
- Recorded: 1980–1981
- Studio: Power Station (New York City)
- Genres: Dance-pop; R&B
- Length: 35:46
- Labels: Capitol (Europe); RCA (North America)
- Producer: Diana Ross

Diana Ross chronology
All the Great Hits (1981)	Why Do Fools Fall in Love (1981)	Silk Electric (1982)

Singles from Why Do Fools Fall in Love
- 1. "Why Do Fools Fall in Love" Released: September 25, 1981; 2. "Mirror Mirror" Released: December 11, 1981; 3. "Work That Body" Released: March 19, 1982; 4. "It's Never Too Late" Released: July 1982

Professional ratings
Review scores
Source	Rating
AllMusic	3/5 stars
The Rolling Stone Album Guide	3/5 stars

Why Do Fools Fall in Love is the twelfth studio album by American R&B singer Diana Ross, released on September 14, 1981, by RCA Records. It was Ross' first of six albums released by the label during the decade. It peaked at No. 15 in the United States (No. 4 R&B), No. 17 in the United Kingdom and the top ten in Sweden, Norway and the Netherlands.

== Background ==
Why Do Fools Fall in Love was the first album Ross recorded after leaving the Motown label, when she signed a $20 million deal with RCA. Originally, Nile Rodgers and Bernard Edwards were slated to produce the follow-up to the platinum Diana (1980) album. However, their schedules were filled with commitments to also produce Debbie Harry's solo debut album KooKoo (1981), Johnny Mathis and another Chic album. Ross had given her word to RCA president Robert Summers to deliver an album for the 1981 holiday selling season.

The album was the first to be produced by Ross herself, and it became her second RIAA-certified platinum album. (Note: This is misleading, since Motown was inconsistent to joining the RIAA for most of their 1960s and 1970s releases. She would have considerably more certifications.) It was also certified gold in Canada and the UK.

After Ross returned "Why Do Fools Fall in Love" to the Top Ten in 1981, a major controversy concerning Frankie Lymon's estate ensued. Three women each were involved in lawsuits and counter-lawsuits over Lymon's copyrights and royalties, claiming to be Lymon's rightful widow. The string of court cases led to the making of the 1998 film Why Do Fools Fall in Love.

Ross embarked on a world tour in support of the album.

The album was remastered and re-released on September 2, 2014, by Funky Town Grooves, with bonus material.

== Singles ==
The album includes the US top 10 hits "Why Do Fools Fall in Love" - a cover of the 1950s Frankie Lymon & the Teenagers classic - and the rock-flavoured "Mirror Mirror".

It also includes "Work That Body", co-written by Ross with Paul Jabara and Ray Chew which was a top 10 hit in the UK and top 15 in the Netherlands. "It's Never Too Late" was also released as a single in some international territories.

Also included on the album is a solo version of "Endless Love", which was a number one duet with Lionel Richie from earlier that year, as well as a version of another 1950s rock & roll classic, "Sweet Nothings" originally recorded by Brenda Lee.

== Track listing ==
Side one
No.	Title	Writer(s)	Length
1.	"Why Do Fools Fall in Love"	Frankie Lymon; Morris Levy	2:53
2.	"Sweet Surrender"	Leonard Stack; Cheryl Christiansen	4:09
3.	"Mirror, Mirror"	Michael Sembello; Dennis Matkosky	6:08
4.	"Endless Love"	Lionel Richie	4:56

Side two
No.	Title	Writer(s)	Length
5.	"It's Never Too Late"	Dan Hartman	3:19
6.	"Think I'm in Love"	L. Cheryl Taylor	4:15
7.	"Sweet Nothings"	Ronnie Self; Dub Albritton	3:00
8.	"Two Can Make It"	Dean Pitchford; Tom Snow	3:24
9.	"Work That Body"	Diana Ross; Paul Jabara; Ray Chew	5:01
Total length:			35:46

2014 Expanded Edition Bonus Tracks (Funky Town Grooves)
No.	Title	Length
10.	"Mirror Mirror" (7" Mix)	3:59
11.	"Mirror Mirror" (7" Alternate Version)	4:06
12.	"Work That Body" (7" Mix)	3:34
13.	"Work That Body" (12" Mix)	6:31
14.	"Work That Body" (Extended Remix)	6:22
15.	"Endless Love" (Edited Version)	3:46
Total length:		1:05:24

== Personnel ==
Credits are adapted from the Why Do Fools Fall in Love liner notes.

Musicians

- Diana Ross – lead vocals (all tracks), backing vocals (1–4, 6–9)
- Rob Mounsey – acoustic piano (1)
- Ray Chew – Rhodes (1, 6), acoustic piano (2–5, 7–9), arrangements (2–5, 8, 9)
- Pat Rebillot – acoustic piano (4)
- Ed Walsh – synthesizers (4)
- Leon Pendarvis – Rhodes (5, 7), arrangements (7)
- Ron Frangipane – acoustic piano (6), synthesizers (6), arrangements (6)
- Bob Kulick – guitar (1), electric guitar (3)
- Eric Gale – electric guitar (1, 2, 5–8) rhythm guitar (3)
- Jeff Mironov – electric guitar (1, 4–7, 9) rhythm guitar (3)
- Neil Jason – bass (1, 3–7, 9)
- Francisco Centeno – bass (2, 8)
- Yogi Horton – drums (all tracks)
- Ralph MacDonald – percussion (1, 3, 5–7, 9)
- George Young – tenor saxophone (1)
- Don Brooks – harmonica (2)
- Michael Brecker – tenor saxophone (7)
- Bert DeCoteaux – horn and string arrangements (1)
- Paul Riser – horn and string arrangements (2, 4, 5, 6, 8)
- Randy Brecker – horn arrangements (3, 7)
- Lamar Alsop – concertmaster (1, 2, 4–6, 8)
- Lionel Richie – lead and backing vocals (4)
- Margaret Dorn – backing vocals (5, 9)
- Leata Galloway – backing vocals (5, 9)
- Millie Whiteside – backing vocals (5, 9)

== Production ==
- Producer – Diana Ross
- Production assistance – Sephra Herman
- Production manager – Matt Murphy
- Engineer – Larry Alexander
- Assistant engineer – Dave Greenberg
- Recorded at the Power Station (New York, NY).
- Mastered by Ted Jensen at Sterling Sound (New York, NY).
- Inside photography – Claude Mougin
- Cover photo – Douglas Kirkland

== Charts ==
=== Weekly charts ===
Chart (1981/82)	Peak position
Australia (Kent Music Report)	47
Canada Top Albums/CDs (RPM)	33
Dutch Albums (Album Top 100)	3
Finnish Albums (Suomen virallinen lista)	3
Japan Albums Chart	28
Norwegian Albums (VG-lista)	5
Swedish Albums (Sverigetopplistan)	6
UK Albums (Official Charts)	17
US Billboard 200	15
US Top R&B/Hip-Hop Albums (Billboard)	4
US Cashbox Top Pop Albums	5

=== Year-end charts ===
Chart (1982)	Position
US Billboard 200	45
US Top R&B/Hip-Hop Albums (Billboard)	18

== Certifications ==
Certifications for Why Do Fools Fall in Love
Region	Certification	Certified units/sales
Canada (Music Canada)	Gold	50,000^{^}
Finland (Musiikkituottajat)	Gold	25,000
United Kingdom (BPI)	Gold	100,000^{^}
United States (RIAA)	Platinum	1,000,000^{^}
^{^} Shipments figures based on certification alone.
