= A Little Bit of Love (RuPaul song) =

1997 single by RuPaul

Single by RuPaul

from the album Foxy Lady
- Released: February 25, 1997
- Recorded: 1996
- Genre: Dance
- Length: 3:55
- Label: Rhino
- Songwriters: RuPaul; Joe Carrano
- Producers: RuPaul; Carrano

RuPaul singles chronology
"Snapshot" (1996)	"A Little Bit of Love" (1997)	"Celebrate" (1997)

Music video
- "A Little Bit of Love" on YouTube

"A Little Bit of Love" is a song and music video performed and produced by drag icon RuPaul and released on February 25, 1997. This was the second single released from the Foxy Lady album. The song was written by RuPaul and Joe Carrano and released through Rhino Records and features guest vocals by Vicki Sue Robinson.

The song reached number twenty-eight on the Hot Dance Club Play chart in the US. The CD single contained six remixes: Welcome's Extended Original Mix, Moretta Electro-Funk Mix, Welcome's Sly Vocal Extended Mix, Hot Mix Version Mix, Moretta Love Beats Mix, and the Edge Factor Dub Mix.

The single's music video depicted RuPaul along with female impersonator Jazzmun and transgender cabaret performer Candis Cayne as aliens out to conquer the world. The video received a GLAAD Media Award nomination for "Best Video of 1998." The clip, directed by Randy Barbato and Fenton Bailey, was in included on RuPaul's Work It Girl compilation DVD.

RuPaul performed the song that same year on The Ricki Lake Show.

== Track listings ==
- A Little Bit Of Love 12" Vinyl promo (PR 7221)
1. A Little Bit Of Love (Plastik Vocal) (7:44)
2. A Little Bit Of Love (Edge Factor Dub) (7:30)
3. A Little Bit Of Love (Welcome's Sly Vocal Extended Mix) (7:32)
4. A Little Bit Of Love (Welcome's Extended Original Mix) (7:07)
- A Little Bit Of Love Maxi-Single, FLP Case (R2 76034)
1. A Little Bit Of Love (Welcome's Extended Original Mix) (7:07)
2. A Little Bit Of Love (Moretta Electro-Funk Mix) (6:00)
3. A Little Bit Of Love (Welcome's Sly Vocal Extended Mix) (7:32)
4. A Little Bit Of Love (Hot Mix Version) (7:27)
5. A Little Bit Of Love (Moretta Love Beats) (4:23)
6. A Little Bit Of Love (Edge Factor Dub) (7:30)

== Chart performance ==
Chart (1997)	Peak position
US Dance Club Songs (Billboard)	28

== Other versions ==
A remixed version of the song was released on Remember Me: Essential, Vol. 1 in 2017; this version has been used in RuPaul's Drag Race and has served as the runway theme on RuPaul's Drag Race UK since season one.

=== Cast Version ===
"A Little Bit of Love" (Cast Version)

Single by RuPaul featuring the Cast of RuPaul's Drag Race UK, series 2
- Released: March 18, 2021
- Recorded: 2020
- Genre: Dance
- Length: 3:52
- Label: World of Wonder
- Songwriters: RuPaul Charles; Joe Carrano; Thomas Hibbitts; Elliot Glen; Lawrence Maidment; Tayce Szura-Radix

RuPaul singles chronology
"U Wear It Well (Queens of the North Ru-Mix)" (2020)	"A Little Bit of Love" (Cast Version) (2021)	"Lucky" (2021)

RuPaul's Drag Race UK singles chronology
"UK Hun?" (2021)	"A Little Bit of Love" (Cast Version) (2021)	"B.D.E. (Big Drag Energy)" (2021)

The top four of RuPaul's Drag Race UK series 2, Bimini Bon-Boulash, Ellie Diamond, Lawrence Chaney, and Tayce recorded a new version of the song as part of the final challenge of the season. It was released on March 18, 2021 to coincide with the season finale. Along with the top 4 recording their own verses on the song the other cast members of the season joined them for the performance.
