= Looking Good, Feeling Gorgeous =

Single by RuPaul

from the album Red Hot
- Released: 2004
- Recorded: 2004
- Label: RuCo, Inc.
- Songwriters: Darrell Martin; Craig Peterson; Assaf Amdursky; William Brown
- Producers: RuPaul; Darrell Martin; Tom Trujillo

RuPaul singles chronology
"Celebrate" (1997)	"Looking Good, Feeling Gorgeous" (2004)	"WorkOut" (2005)

Audio video
- "Looking Good, Feeling Gorgeous" on YouTube

"Looking Good Feeling Gorgeous" is the first single from RuPaul's album Red Hot. The dance/house song is a self-affirming anthem of self-confidence, particularly in relation to one's appearance. It was released exclusively on a CD single on RuCo, Inc., RuPaul's own label.

In June 2023, Trixie Mattel released a cover of the song, with all proceeds donated to the Drag Isn't Dangerous fund.

== Lyrics ==
The section during which RuPaul speaks contains numerous references to the documentary film Paris is Burning. Including a direct quote from one of the films main characters, Venus Xtravaganza: "Touch this skin, darling, touch this skin honey, touch all of this skin! You just can't take it! You're just an overgrown orangutan!"

== Music video ==
The single's music video featured drag performer Shirley Q. Liquor getting cosmetic surgery and transforming from an overweight woman eating fried chicken into RuPaul. The video featured male fitness model Rusty Joiner as RuPaul's scantily-clad surgeon.

The music video was directed by fashion photographer Mike Ruiz, and produced for Caya Filmworks by Jeff Beasley. The video is also a social criticism of the standards of beauty in our society.

== Track listings ==
1. "Shirley Q. Liquor & Watusi Jenkins" (album version)
2. "Looking Good, Feeling Gorgeous" (High Heel Steppin' Radio / D1 Music Radio)
3. "Looking Good, Feeling Gorgeous" (Gomi Radio)
4. "Looking Good, Feeling Gorgeous" (High Heel Steppin' Mixshow – D1 Music Mixshow)
5. "Looking Good, Feeling Gorgeous" (Gomi Mixshow)
6. "Looking Good, Feeling Gorgeous" (High Heel Steppin' Dub – D1 Music Dub)
7. "Looking Good, Feeling Gorgeous" (Gomi Dub)
8. "Looking Good, Feeling Gorgeous" (album version; clean)

== Chart performance ==
It debuted on Billboard's Hot Dance Club Play chart as the No. 1 breakout track peaking at number 2.

=== Weekly charts ===
Weekly chart performance for "Looking Good, Feeling Gorgeous"
Chart (2004)	Peak position
US Dance Club Songs (Billboard)	2

=== Year-end charts ===
Year-end chart performance for "Looking Good, Feeling Gorgeous"
Chart (2004)	Position
US Hot Dance Club Play	25
