= Work Drugs =

American musical duo

- Origin: Philadelphia, United States
- Genres: Dream pop, new wave, synthpop, chillwave, electronic
- Years active: 2010–present
- Label: Bobby Cahn Records / State Capital Records
- Members: Thomas Crystal; Benjamin Louisiana
- Website: workdrugs.wordpress.com

Work Drugs is an American synth pop band from Philadelphia, founded by Thomas Crystal and Benjamin Louisiana.

The band consists of Crystal (vocals and guitar), alongside Louisiana (vocals and keys), Jonas Ohh (drums), Mr. Kansas City (bass), and Katie Nicks (vocals and percussion). Since its founding, the band has frequently toured on the festival circuit in the United States, including SXSW and CMJ, as well as national support slots for the likes of Two Door Cinema Club, Umphrey's McGee, Maps and Atlases, Battles, Peter, Bjorn & John, Sun Airway, Memoryhouse, Parts and Labor, J.Viewz, and more.

The band have remained prolific, releasing 22 albums and 6 EPs between 2011 and 2026.

== History ==
Work Drugs is a Philadelphia-based recording project started in 2010 by Thomas Crystal and Benjamin Louisiana on the banks of the Delaware River.

Self-described as a band that "makes music specifically for boating, sexting, dancing, yachting, and living" or "Philadelphia's premier Bat Mitzvah and Quinceanera party band", Work Drugs' name was given by their friend Eduardo S. as they were sailing the Baja of Mexico. Band members Tom and Ben bonded together in sailing school over music, which is when they started composing songs for their first album. In a 2011 article, The Guardian, described their music commenting, “It's like hearing Steely Dan’s “Aja” through fog".

Their earliest efforts arrived sporadically in the form of singles ("Third Wave", "Dog Daze" and "Rad Racer"). On June 27, 2011, the duo released their first album Summer Blood, which consisted of their first few singles and three acoustic recordings. "Rad Racer" from Summer Blood was featured in the Urban Outfitters commercial for "Favorite Fall Jeans of 2011". In his 2011 album, Still Sound, XXYYXX included a remixed version of "Rad Racer". Later the same year, they released their sophomore album Aurora Lies. The album, released on November 7, 2011, was the band's first release to bring a collection of entirely previously unreleased tracks.

On July 10, 2012, Work Drugs resurfaced with their third album, Absolute Bearing.

== Live performances ==
Work Drugs have played live shows across North America in cities such as Boston, New York City, Chicago and San Francisco. In April 2011, the group supported Northern Ireland-based indie rock band Two Door Cinema Club and Chicago indie rock band Maps & Atlases on a tour of the West Coast of the United States.

In late 2011, Work Drugs supported Peter, Bjorn & John and Memoryhouse on their east coast tour through Philadelphia.

In February 2012, Work Drugs supported Umphrey's McGee on their east coast run through Boston, Philadelphia and Baltimore.

== Discography ==
=== Studio albums ===
Year	Details
2011	Summer Blood: Released: 27 June 2011; Label: Self-released
2011	Aurora Lies: Released: 7 November 2011; Label: Bobby Cahn Records
2011	Cayman Islands Sessions: Released: 15 December 2011; Label: Bobby Cahn Records
2012	Absolute Bearing: Released: 10 July 2012; Label: Bobby Cahn Records
2012	Delta: Released: 5 December 2012; Label: Bobby Cahn Records
2013	Mavericks: Released: 18 June 2013; Label: Bobby Cahn Records
2014	Insurgents: Released: 4 March 2014; Label: Bobby Cahn Records
2014	Runaways: Released: 7 October 2014; Label: Bobby Cahn Records
2014	Cayman Islands Sessions, Vol.II: Released: 2 December 2014; Label: Bobby Cahn Records
2015	Louisa: Released: 7 August 2015; Label: Bobby Cahn Records
2016	Method Acting: Released: 19 August 2016; Label: Self released
2017	Sierra: Released: 20 January 2017; Label: Self released
2017	Flaunt The Imperfection: Released: 11 August 2017; Label: Self released
2018	Holding on to Forever: Released: 17 September 2018; Label: Self released
2019	Fantasy File: Released: 30 August 2019; Label: Self released
2020	A Matter of Degrees: Released: 18 September 2020; Label: Self released
2021	Pride and Competition: Released: 22 October 2021; Label: Self released
2022	Some You Leave Out: Released: 18 November 2022; Label: Self released
2023	Dreams Rules Desire: Released: 22 September 2023; Label: Self released
2024	Cayman Island Sessions, Vol. 3: Released: 19 April 2024; Label: Self released
2025	Post Modern Expression: Released: 31 October 2025; Label: Self released
2026	Another Lost Remark: Released: 18 September 2026; Label: Self released

=== Extended plays ===
Year	Details
2013	Amore EP: Released: 14 February 2013; Label: Bobby Cahn Records
2018	Mixed Drinks EP: Released: 5 March 2018
2018	Infinity Eyes EP: Released: 27 March 2018
2018	Pacific Heart EP: Released: 27 April 2018
2018	After Midnight EP: Released: 20 June 2018
2018	Sunset Mornings EP: Released: 8 August 2018

=== Remixes ===
- Little Scream – "The Heron and the Fox" (Work Drugs Remix) (2011 Secretly Canadian)
- Bon Iver - "Beth/Rest" (Work Drugs Remix) (2012 Jagjaguwar)
