= Ho Ho Ho (album) =

Studio album by RuPaul
- Released: October 28, 1997
- Recorded: July 1997
- Studio: Horizon (Capitol Heights, Maryland)
- Genre: Christmas
- Length: 50:22
- Label: Rhino
- Producers: Michael Hacker; Michael Rosenman; Joe Carrano

RuPaul chronology
| Foxy Lady (1996) | Ho Ho Ho (1997) | Red Hot (2004) |

Ho Ho Ho, also known as VH-1 Presents RuPaul: Ho Ho Ho, is a Christmas album and the third studio album by American singer and drag queen RuPaul. Released on October 28, 1997, by the record label Rhino, it is RuPaul's first album featuring Christmas music and serves as a follow-up to his 1996 album Foxy Lady. RuPaul co-produced the album with Fenton Bailey and Randy Barbato from the production company World of Wonder. Ho Ho Ho consists of thirteen tracks, including ten covers of Christmas standards and carols, and three original songs written by Joe Carrano and RuPaul. Music critics frequently described the album as an example of camp though RuPaul clarified that it included several more serious covers, specifically "All Alone on Christmas" and "Hard Candy Christmas".

Ho Ho Ho was praised by critics following its release and during retrospective reviews; its cheerful and humorous compositions were frequently cited as the album's highlights, though some commentators responded negatively to the record's use of humor and the lack of clarity in its overall message. The album peaked at number 27 on the Heatseekers Albums Billboard chart, selling a little more than 4,000 copies in one week. To support the record, RuPaul filmed a television special as part of his VH1 talk show The RuPaul Show.

== Recording and release ==
Ho Ho Ho was recorded in RuPaul's living room in New York City; (Note: AllMusic reports that the album was recorded in Horizon Studios, located in Capitol Heights, Maryland.) it was completed over the span of three days in July 1997. RuPaul attributed the album's success to his chemistry with American singer Michelle Visage, saying: "You can hear us having a good time. So whether it was a Hanukkah album or a Kwanzaa album, it didn't make a difference, because the chemistry is there." RuPaul and Visage interpreted Christmas songs as examples of camp while describing them as still holding clear messages; RuPaul explained: "Even the camp stuff still holds the true meaning of Christmas, the sweetness and the love about another year gone by." The album's record label Rhino executive promoted the album through the tagline: "Celebrate Christmas with classic holiday songs and camp, RuPaul style!"

Ho Ho Ho was made available on October 28, 1997, by Rhino on cassette and CD. It was rereleased as a digital download in 2009 through Rhino and Tommy Boy Records. The album was also known as VH-1 Presents RuPaul: Ho Ho Ho. In 2023, Ho Ho Ho was issued on vinyl, and a deluxe edition, which included RuPaul's cover of "The Little Drummer Boy" and four remixes, was released on streaming services. RuPaul promoted the record by headlining a 1997 Christmas special as a part of his VH1 talk show The RuPaul Show.

In the United States, Ho Ho Ho reached a peak position of number 27 on the Heatseekers Albums Billboard chart, and remained on the chart for two weeks. It sold a little more than 4,000 copies in one week. The remix of "Celebrate" peaked at number 31 on Billboard Dance Club Songs chart on October 11, 1997, and remained on the chart for a total of seven weeks.

== Composition and lyrics ==
The opening track for Ho Ho Ho is "With Bells On", a "disco-influenced country" interpretation of the Dolly Parton and Kenny Rogers song of the same name. Visage is featured on the track, and sings about batteries as her only memorable Christmas present. The second track is RuPaul's re-imagining of "Rudolph, the Red-Nosed Reindeer" as "RuPaul, the Red-Nosed Drag Queen". In "All I Want For Christmas", the singer makes a list of requests for various plastic surgery procedures that he would like to receive for the holiday, including cheek implants, chin implants, and a buttock augmentation. He also recorded a cover of "All Alone on Christmas", calling it his favorite Christmas song; he clarified that he wanted to do a serious interpretation of the track.

RuPaul's covers of "I Saw Daddy Kissing Santa Claus" and "Hard Candy Christmas" were noted for their use of camp. He identified "Hard Candy Christmas" as one of the "serious ones" on the album, and said it was only considered camp due to "the fact that [he was] doing it". When recording the song, Visage was unfamiliar with its source The Best Little Whorehouse in Texas, and sang it according to RuPaul's direction. Carol Hall, who had written the song, had described RuPaul's cover as her favorite version, and ranked it above Dolly Parton's interpretation. The album also includes a cover of "You're a Mean One, Mr. Grinch", incorporating elements from funk, and "Christmas Train (Medley)", serving as a club remix of various Christmas songs. The final track is a remix of the song "Celebrate"; the original version had previously appeared on RuPaul's second album Foxy Lady (1996).

== Critical reception ==
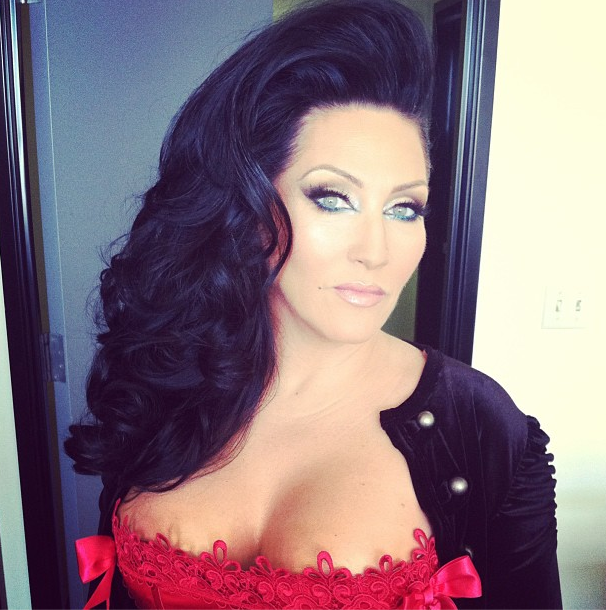
RuPaul attributed the album's success to his chemistry with American singer Michelle Visage (pictured in 2015); Visage was featured on "With Bells On" and "Hard Candy Christmas".

Upon its release, Ho Ho Ho received primarily positive reviews from music critics. Vibe's Shawnee Smith described the album as a "collection of reinterpretations guaranteed to lift your spirits", and commended it for its up-tempo instrumentals and ability to reverse "holiday depression". While highlighting the changes made to the songs' titles, Ken Veeder of The Advocate positively responded to RuPaul's interpretations of the Christmas classic in "the gay way". Veeder pointed to "I Saw Daddy Kissing Santa Claus" as his favorite track. E! News' Joal Ryan noted that the album was one of the most boundary-pushing Christmas releases of the year. Billboard's Melinda Newman considered the album a novelty record, praising it as a more humorous example of the genre.

Ho Ho Ho has also been the subject of praise from several retrospective reviews. During a 2015 interview with the Gay Times, RuPaul and Visage stated that Ho Ho Ho had become a "classic Christmas traditional album" alongside releases by American singers Johnny Mathis and Barbra Streisand. In a 2015 article, Idolator's Robbie Daw described it as a "yuletide classic". The same year, Darren Scott of the Gay Times praised it as one of his favorite Christmas albums of all time, and a writer from OutTV referred to it as a "collection of cheeky and cheerful tunes". On the other hand, in a 2017 article, Junkee's Bel Ryan felt the album had "for the most part, fallen into the mighty chasm of obscurity".

In a 2016 retrospective review, Serene Dominic of Tucson Weekly jokingly included RuPaul as part of its list of artists who should not have released a Christmas album for Ho Ho Ho. The article was written as a parody of the alt-right and the "War on Christmas", Dominic joking that the album led to the creation of the bathroom bills.

Some critics have negatively responded to RuPaul's use of humor in Ho Ho Ho. AllMusic's Stephen Thomas Erlewine criticized RuPaul's reliance on camp in the album, writing that it was "tired, predictable, and simply not funny" and that it was a "sad display from an entertainer who used to be hip, clever, and very funny". Newman questioned the effectiveness of the record's overall message, noting that RuPaul's message in the liner notes about "creating one's own family for the holidays" did not fit with the image of "Ru's Christmas panties around his ankles". While she responded positively to a majority of the songs, Newman viewed "You're A Mean One, Mr. Grinch" as an unsuccessful cover. In an interview with Queerty, American drag queen Hedda Lettuce revealed that RuPaul's cover of "Hard Candy Christmas" was her least favorite Christmas song of all time; Lettuce said that the song "makes [him] want to shove a candy cane in [his] eye".

== Track listing ==
Credits adapted from the liner notes of Ho Ho Ho. All songs produced by Joe Carrano and Welcome.

| No. | Title | Writer(s) | Length |
|---|---|---|---|
| 1. | "With Bells On" (with Michelle Visage) | Dolly Parton | 3:35 |
| 2. | "RuPaul the Red-Nosed Reindeer" | Johnny Marks | 3:32 |
| 3. | "All I Want for Christmas" | Donald Yetter Gardner | 3:25 |
| 4. | "Santa Baby" | Joan Javits; Philip Springer; Tony Springer | 4:46 |
| 5. | "All Alone on Christmas" | Steven Van Zandt | 3:12 |
| 6. | "Christmas Train (Medley)" | Joe Carrano; RuPaul | 3:47 |
| 7. | "Christmas Nite" (with Latasha Spencer) | Carrano; RuPaul | 7:35 |
| 8. | "Funky Christmas (Christmas at My House)" | Carrano; RuPaul | 2:40 |
| 9. | "I Saw Daddy Kissing Santa Claus" | Thomas Connor | 2:49 |
| 10. | "Here Comes Santa Claus (Right Down Santa Claus Lane)" | Gene Autry; Oakley Haldeman | 2:57 |
| 11. | "You’re a Mean One, Mr. Grinch" | Albert Hague; Dr. Seuss | 4:47 |
| 12. | "Hard Candy Christmas" (with Michelle Visage & Barbara Mitchell) | Carol Hall | 4:50 |
| 13. | "Celebrate (New Year’s Remix)" | Pete Lorimer; RuPaul; Richard Vission | 8:11 |
| Total length: | | | 50:22 |

Ho Ho Ho – Deluxe edition
| No. | Title | Writer(s) | Producer(s) | Length |
|---|---|---|---|---|
| 14. | "Little Drummer Boy" (with Michael Hacker and Michael Rosenman) | Katherine K. Davis | Carrano, Lorimer, Vission, Michael Hacker, Michael Rosenman |
| 15. | "Little Drummer Boy - Slice's 1" Club Remix" (with Michael Hacker and Michael Rosenman) | Davis | Carrano, Lorimer, Vission, Hacker, Rosenman |
| 16. | "Little Drummer Boy - Slice's Rum Pum Pum Dub" (with Michael Hacker and Michael Rosenman) | Davis | Carrano, Lorimer, Vission, Hacker, Rosenman |
| 17. | "Little Drummer Boy - White's Club Mix" (with Michael Hacker and Michael Rosenman) | Davis | Carrano, Lorimer, Vission, Hacker, Rosenman |
| 18. | "Little Drummer Boy - R&B Mix" (with Michael Hacker and Michael Rosenman) | Davis | Carrano, Lorimer, Vission, Hacker, Rosenman |
| Total length: | | | | 82:00 |

Notes

- "Christmas Nite" contains a sample from The Three Degrees's 1974 single "When Will I See You Again".
- "Here Comes Santa Claus (Right Down Santa Claus Lane)" contains a sample from Johnnie Taylor's 1976 single "Disco Lady".

== Personnel ==
Credits adapted from AllMusic.

- RuPaul – executive producer
- Latasha Spencer – performer
- Michelle Visage – performer
- Fenton Bailey – executive producer
- Randy Barbato – executive producer
- Pete Lorimer – arranger
- Richard "Humpty" Vission – arranger
- Dennis Mitchell – engineer
- Roger Arnold – assistant engineer, engineer, performer
- Brian Alex – assistant
- Kelly Bienvenue – assistant
- Lee Genesis – assistant
- Barbara Mitchell – assistant
- Yolanda Wyns – assistant
- Michael Hacker – producer, remixing
- Michael Rosenman – producer, remixing
- Joe Carrano – programming, producer, engineer, mixing
- Dan Hersch – mastering
- Rachel Gutek – design
- Hugh Brown – art direction

== Charts ==
| Chart (1997) | Peak position |
|---|---|
| US Top Heatseekers Albums (Billboard) | 27 |

== Release history ==
| Country | Date | Format(s) | Label |
|---|---|---|---|
| Worldwide | October 28, 1997 | CD | Rhino |
| Worldwide | October 28, 1997 | Cassette | Rhino |
| Worldwide | 2009 | Digital download | Rhino/Tommy Boy Records |
| Worldwide | November 10, 2023 | Streaming | Tommy Boy Records |
| Worldwide | November 10, 2023 | Vinyl | Tommy Boy Records |
