= American (album) =

Studio album by RuPaul
- Released: March 24, 2017
- Genre: Dance
- Length: 36:22
- Labels: RuCo, Inc.
- Producers: Kummerspeck; Markaholic; Ellis Miah; Skeltal Ki; YLXR; Vjuan Allure

RuPaul chronology
| Remember Me: Essential, Vol. 1 (2017) | American (2017) | Christmas Party (2018) |

Singles from American
- 1. "Call Me Mother" Released: 2017; 2. "Kitty Girl" Released: March 15, 2018; 3. "American" Released: June 14, 2018; 4. "Mighty Love" Released: July 12, 2019

American is the eleventh studio album by American singer and drag queen RuPaul. The album was released on March 24, 2017, to coincide with the premiere of the ninth season of RuPaul's Drag Race. RuPaul has said that the album is influenced by the 2016 United States presidential election.

== Track listing ==
| No. | Title | Writer(s) | Producer(s) | Length |
|---|---|---|---|---|
| 1. | "American" | RuPaul Charles; Lior Rosner; Jack Wilson | KUMMERSPECK | 3:04 |
| 2. | "Kitty Girl" | Charles; Mark Byers | Markaholic | 3:34 |
| 3. | "Charisma, Uniqueness, Nerve and Talent" | Charles; Ellis Miah; Fredrick Miñano | Skeltal Ki; Miah | 3:50 |
| 4. | "Broke Me Down" | Charles; Chris Sendziak | YLXR | 2:56 |
| 5. | "Getaway" | Charles; Miñano | Ki | 3:42 |
| 6. | "Call Me Mother" | Charles; Miñano | Ki | 3:21 |
| 7. | "Spotlight" | Charles; Warren Bembry; Miñano | Vjan Allure | 3:20 |
| 8. | "Mighty Love" (featuring KUMMERSPECK) | Charles; Jimmy Harry | KUMMERSPECK | 3:42 |
| 9. | "Hey Doll" | Charles; Miah | Miah | 3:04 |
| 10. | "Lady Cowboy" | Charles; Byers | Markaholic | 3:02 |
| 11. | "It Ain't Over" | Charles; Miah | KUMMERSPECK | 2:47 |
| Total length: | | | | 36:22 |

== Chart performance ==
| Chart (2017) | Peak position |
|---|---|
| US Billboard Top Dance/Electronic Albums | 12 |
| US Billboard Independent Albums | 30 |
