= Snapshot (RuPaul song) =

- CD single

Single by RuPaul

from the album Foxy Lady
- Released: 1996
- Recorded: 1996
- Genre: Pop; dance
- Length: 3:01
- Label: Rhino
- Songwriters: RuPaul; Eric Kupper
- Producer: Eric Kupper

RuPaul singles chronology
"Don't Go Breaking My Heart" (1994)	"Snapshot" (1996)	"A Little Bit of Love" (1997)

Music video
- "Snapshot" on YouTube

"Snapshot" is a song by American drag queen, television personality, actor, musician, and model RuPaul, released in 1996 by Rhino as the first single from his second album, Foxy Lady (1996). Written by RuPaul with its producer Eric Kupper, it peaked at number 95 on the US Billboard Hot 100 and number four on the Billboard Hot Dance Club Play chart. The accompanying music video was filmed in Los Angeles and directed by Randy Barbato and Fenton Bailey.

== Critical reception ==
Larry Flick from Billboard magazine wrote, "It has been way too long since La Ru served his many club disciples with a new anthem. Now teamed with the equally festive folks at Rhino, he makes up for lost time with a fun single that could easily match the success of his signature 'Supermodel' breakthrough. He is once again strolling up and down the runway, playfully spouting on the joys of being the life (and centerpiece) of the party. Catchy as can be, the song is supported by a bevy of cute remixes that range in tone from jittery EuroNRG to shimmy-inducing pop/house. Pick one and work it."

== Track listings ==
- US 12" vinyl (1996) (R0 76032)
1. Snapshot (Kupper's Funkin Dub) (8:53)
2. Snapshot (Kupper's Radio Edit) (3:03)
3. Snapshot (Vission & Lorimer Disco-Tech) (6:22)
4. Snapshot (Welcome's Moody Radio Edit) (3:24)

== Chart ==
Chart (1996)	Peak position
US Billboard Hot 100	95
US Dance Club Songs (Billboard)	4
