= Realness =

Studio album by RuPaul
- Released: March 2, 2015
- Recorded: 2014–15
- Genres: Dance; deep house; diva house
- Length: 41:45
- Label: RuCo Inc.
- Producers: JROB; Markaholic; Ellis Miah; Frankmusik; Eric Kupper; Matt Moss; Dave Audé; Lucian Piane

RuPaul chronology
RuPaul Presents: CoverGurlz 2 (2015)	Realness (2015)	Slay Belles (2015)

Singles from Realness
- 1. "Born Naked (Stadium Remix)" Released: May 18, 2015; 2. "The Realness" Released: May 2, 2016

Realness is the eighth studio album from singer and drag queen RuPaul. It was released on March 2, 2015 and is RuPaul's first album to feature a Parental Advisory warning label. The album was released to coincide with the seventh season premiere of RuPaul's Drag Race, which premiered the same day as the album's release. The album features guest appearances from Michelle Visage, Rebecca Romijn and Dave Audé, among others. Upon its release, the album charted at number 6 on the Billboard Dance/Electronic Albums, and 38 on the Independent Albums. The album sees RuPaul reuniting with producer Eric Kupper, producer of his debut album Supermodel of the World.

== Background ==
Realness was first mentioned in a Billboard interview with RuPaul on February 24, 2015, in which he commented on the titles meaning, saying "when drag talks about realness, it's always with a wink because, you know, here I am, a drag queen talking about looking and feeling real, which is the joke itself." Sonically, the album is heavily influenced by 1990s house music and diva house. The album was released for pre-order later, and eventually released on March 2, 2015.

== Track listing ==
Adapted from iTunes metadata.

All tracks are written by RuPaul.

No.	Title	Length
1.	"L.A. Rhythm" (featuring Michelle Visage and JROB)	4:41
2.	"Color Me Love" (featuring Rebecca Romijn and Markaholic)	3:34
3.	"I Met Him On the Dance Floor" (Interlude)	0:45
4.	"I Blame You" (featuring Ellis Miah)	5:19
5.	"Throw Ya Hands Up (2015)" (featuring Lady Bunny and Ellis Miah)	3:54
6.	"This Is a Picnic" (Interlude)	0:52
7.	"Die Tomorrow" (featuring Frankmusik)	3:06
8.	"The Realness" (featuring Eric Kupper)	3:25
9.	"A Dream You're Having" (Interlude)	0:26
10.	"L.A. Rhythm" (featuring Michelle Visage and Matt Moss)	3:38
11.	"Born Naked" (Stadium Remix) (featuring Clairy Browne)	2:46
12.	"Drag Mocks Identity" (Interlude)	0:19
13.	"Step It Up" (featuring Dave Audé)	3:33
14.	"LGBT" (featuring Chi Chi LaRue & Markaholic)	3:56
15.	"Thorns of a Rose" (Interlude)	1:31

== Charts ==
Chart (2015)	Peak position
US Billboard Dance/Electronic Albums	6
US Billboard Independent Albums	38

== Release history ==
Region	Date	Label	Format
Worldwide	March 2, 2015	RuCo Inc.	Digital download
