= You're a Winner, Baby =

Studio album by RuPaul
- Released: January 10, 2020
- Genre: Dance
- Length: 25:54
- Label: RuCo Inc. The Orchard

RuPaul chronology
Christmas Party (2018)	You're a Winner, Baby (2020)	Mamaru (2022)

Singles from You're a Winner, Baby
- 1. "Bring Back My Girls" Released: May 30, 2020; 2. "Condragulations" Released: January 9, 2021; 3. "I'm A Winner, Baby" Released: June 20, 2021

You're a Winner, Baby is the thirteenth studio album by American singer and drag queen RuPaul, released on January 10, 2020. The album features eight new songs. The album was released on the same day as the Netflix original television series AJ and the Queen, starring RuPaul.

== Singles ==
On May 30, 2020, coinciding with the finale of season 12 of RuPaul's Drag Race, "Bring Back My Girls" was released as the first single alongside the standalone single "The Shady Bunch" featuring the cast of season 12. "Bring Back My Girls" was also used as a lipsync between the top 3 in the finale of season 12. "Bring Back My Girls" is also used as the runway theme for season 13 of RuPaul's Drag Race.

Both “Bring Back My Girls” and “Condragulations” are inspired by RuPaul’s iconic sayings which she routinely utilizes on each episode of RuPaul’s Drag Race. The saying “Bring Back My Girls” is used to welcome queens back to the stage after the judge panel’s deliberation period for the episode’s maxi challenge. “Condragulations” is another of RuPaul’s popular phrases which is a play on words used to congratulate the winner of a specific challenge. On January 9, 2021 "Condragulations" was released as the second single featuring 7 members of the cast of RuPaul's Drag Race season 13, Elliott with 2 Ts, Gottmik, Kandy Muse, LaLa Ri, Olivia Lux, Symone, and Tina Burner.

== Track listing ==
You're a Winner, Baby track listing
No.	Title	Writer(s)	Producer	Length
1.	"London"	RuPaul Charles; Jack Wilson; Lior Rosner	KUMMERSPECK	3:20
2.	"Birthday Song"	Charles; Wilson; Rosner	KUMMERSPECK	2:36
3.	"Bring Back My Girls"	Charles; Wilson; Rosner	KUMMERSPECK	2:43
4.	"I'm a Winner, Baby"	Charles; Wilson; Rosner	KUMMERSPECK	3:38
5.	"Condragulations"	Charles; Wilson; Rosner	KUMMERSPECK	3:26
6.	"Super Sexy Lady"	Charles; Wilson; Rosner	KUMMERSPECK	3:48
7.	"Blessed"	Charles; Wilson; Rosner	KUMMERSPECK	3:28
8.	"Ruby Is Red Hot" (Kummerspeck Redux)	Charles; Wilson; Rosner	KUMMERSPECK	2:54
Total length:				25:54

== Chart positions ==
Chart (2020)	Peak position
UK Album Downloads (OCC)	36

== See also ==
- List of 2020 albums
