= Christmas Party (RuPaul album) =

Studio album by RuPaul
- Released: November 1, 2018
- Genre: Christmas
- Length: 28:23
- Label: RuCo Inc.
- Producer: Mark Byers

RuPaul chronology
American (2017)	Christmas Party (2018)	You're a Winner, Baby (2020)

Singles from Christmas Party
- 1. "Super Queen" Released: February 15, 2019

Christmas Party is the twelfth studio album and third Christmas album by American drag queen RuPaul, released on November 1, 2018. The album features remixes of previously released holiday tracks, including "Christmas Cookies" and "My Favorite Holiday", as well as new songs, such as "Christmas Queen" and "Hey Sis, It's Christmas".

== Background and promotion ==
RuPaul announced the album in August 2018. Select songs were featured on the television special, RuPaul's Drag Race Holi-slay Spectacular, which aired on VH1 on December 7, 2018. Speaking on the album, RuPaul said: "Celebrating the holidays with my most festive girls inspired me to record my new album, Christmas Party."

== Track listing ==
All songs written by RuPaul Charles and Mark Byers.

No.	Title	Length
1.	"Get to You (For Christmas)" (featuring Markaholic)	3:25
2.	"Hello Hello Hello (Interlude)"	1:05
3.	"Hey Sis, It's Christmas" (featuring Markaholic)	3:11
4.	"Christmas Queen"	3:20
5.	"My Favorite Holiday" (Matt Pop Remix)	3:27
6.	"Silence (Interlude)"	0:30
7.	"Super Queen" (Runway Remix)	3:51
8.	"Hey Sis (Reprise)"	2:21
9.	"Christmas Cookies 2.0"	2:49
10.	"Christmas Party (ft. Michelle Visage)"	3:44
11.	"Goodbye (Interlude)"	0:36
Total length:		28:23

Track listing adapted from the iTunes Store
