= Slay Belles =

Studio album by RuPaul
- Released: October 23, 2015
- Genres: Christmas; pop; dance
- Length: 39:43
- Label: RuCo Inc.
- Producers: Ellis Miah; Markaholic

RuPaul chronology
Realness (2015)	Slay Belles (2015)	Butch Queen (2016)

Slay Belles is the ninth studio album and second Christmas album from American singer and drag queen RuPaul. It was released exclusively via iTunes and Amazon on 23 October 2015, through RuPaul's label RuCo. It was also made available to stream through Spotify. Slay Belles sees a return to Christmas music for RuPaul after releasing his first festive album, Ho Ho Ho, in 1997. The album features RuPaul's frequent collaborators, Michelle Visage and Big Freedia, as well as Markaholic, Ellis Miah, Todrick Hall and Siedah Garrett. The album's interludes feature the Pit Crew from RuPaul's Drag Race.

== Background ==
RuPaul released his first Christmas album, Ho, Ho, Ho, in October 1997, almost exactly 18 years before the release of Slay Belles. The album was a combination of original songs, standards and comedy vignettes. The album was tied into a television Christmas special from The RuPaul Show on VH1. Much of the humor on the album was of a risqué nature, making it quite different from traditionally wholesome holiday albums. For instance, the classic "I Saw Mommy Kissing Santa Claus" lyrics were changed to "I Saw Daddy Kissing Santa Claus".

News that RuPaul was releasing his second Christmas album came after he posted the LP's track list on Twitter, just two days before Slay Belles release date. A picture of RuPaul, Ellis Miah and Siedah Garrett recording "Brand New Year" in the studio was also posted to his Twitter account the same day. The album was subsequently released on 23 October 2015, just in time for the festive season.

Musically, the album sees a departure from RuPaul's first Christmas album and his seventh studio album, Realness, released earlier in 2015. The lyrics throughout Slay Belles focus on being more heartfelt and meaningful than the comedic themes featured in his 1997 Christmas album. The album also sees RuPaul return to a pop/dance-pop sound after focusing on more electronic and recently house music on Born Naked (2014) and Realness (2015).

The album's title is a play on 'sleigh bells', with 'sleigh' replaced with 'slay', a word frequently used within the drag and LGBT community meaning amazing, and 'bells' replaced with 'belles' meaning beautiful women.

== Promotion ==
A music video for "Nothing For Christmas" was released on World of Wonder's YouTube channel on December 10, 2015. It features archive footage of RuPaul in the 1980s from the archives of Nelson Sullivan.

On December 13, 2015, "RuPaul's Green Screen Christmas" aired on Logo and featured music videos for "Merry Christmas Mary", "Jingle Dem Bells", "Deck The Halls", "You're The Star (On My Christmas Tree)", "From Your Heart", "Christmas Cookies" & "Brand New Year". The show and videos featured guest appearances from Big Freedia, Todrick Hall, Michelle Visage, Siedah Garrett and the Pit Crew & contestants from RuPaul's Drag Race. The videos featured in "RuPaul's Green Screen Christmas" were uploaded to Logo's YouTube channel on December 15, 2015.

== Track listing ==
All tracks are written by RuPaul, except where noted.

No.	Title	Producer(s)	Length
1.	"Hi Pit Crew" (Interlude)		1:01
2.	"Merry Christmas, Mary"		2:57
3.	"Everybody Else's Money" (Interlude)		0:26
4.	"Christmas Is About Love"		3:40
5.	"Redefined Christmas" (Interlude)		1:14
6.	"From Your Heart" (featuring Michelle Visage)		3:07
7.	"Stripping in the Living Room" (Interlude)		0:11
8.	"You're the Star (On My Christmas Tree)" (written by RuPaul and Lucian Piane)	Markaholic	3:22
9.	"BLT" (Interlude)		0:30
10.	"My Favorite Holiday" (featuring Markaholic)		3:32
11.	"Do It Forever, Daddy" (Interlude)		0:49
12.	"Christmas Cookies"		3:24
13.	"Jingle Bells" (Interlude)		0:22
14.	"Jingle Dem Bells" (featuring Big Freedia & Ellis Miah)		2:58
15.	"BB Gun" (Interlude)		1:28
16.	"Nothing for Christmas"		3:08
17.	"Celebrity Shopper" (Interlude)		1:07
18.	"Deck the Halls" (featuring Todrick Hall)		4:21
19.	"Joy to the World" (Interlude)		0:27
20.	"Brand New Year" (featuring Siedah Garrett)		4:02
21.	"Merry Christmas, Mary" (Reprise)		1:42

== Charts ==
Chart (2015)	Peak position
US Billboard Dance/Electronic Albums	21

== Release history ==
Region	Date	Label	Format
Worldwide	October 23, 2015	RuCo Inc.	Digital download
