= Mamaru (album) =

Studio album by RuPaul
- Released: January 7, 2022
- Recorded: 2021
- Genre: Bubblegum pop; hyperpop
- Length: 30:12
- Label: RuCo Inc. The Orchard
- Producer: Skeltal Ki

RuPaul chronology
You're a Winner, Baby (2020)	Mamaru (2022)	Black Butta (2023)

Singles from Mamaru
- 1. "Blame It on the Edit" Released: October 8, 2021; 2. "Just What They Want" Released: November 5, 2021; 3. "Catwalk" Released: December 3, 2021; 4. "Smile" Released: January 7, 2022; 5. "Who Is She" Released: September 19, 2022

Mamaru is the fourteenth studio album by American singer and drag queen RuPaul, released on January 7, 2022. The album was released on the same day as the premiere of the fourteenth season of RuPaul's Drag Race. The song "Catwalk" and "Just What They Want" were used during the runway presentations segment of the show.

== Singles ==
"Blame It on the Edit" was released as the first single on October 8, 2021, preceding the album's release. A music video was released alongside the single, directed by Weston Allen. On April 1, 2023, a remix featuring the top four finalists from RuPaul's Drag Race season 15 was released.

On November 5, 2021, "Just What They Want" was released as the second single from the album with a lyric video.

On December 2, 2021, the third single, "Catwalk" was released from the album. On April 9, 2022, a remix featuring the top five finalists from RuPaul's Drag Race season 14 was released.

== Reception ==
Stephen Daw of Billboard wrote, "Throughout Mamaru, the 'Supermodel' star delivers what fans have come to expect from her — fun, danceable singles that are made for you to strut to. Some songs like 'Blame It on the Edit', 'Queendom' and 'Pretty Pretty Gang Gang' see Ru leaning into a slightly edgier, updated hip-hop sound, but others like 'Catwalk' see the star capitalizing on the pop that made her a superstar." Ian Fredrickson of The Daily Californian gave the album a 3.5 out of 5, and wrote that "Mamaru shows audiences young and old that RuPaul is still in her prime nearly half a century into her career. Incredibly fun to listen to — with some tracks definitively worth putting on your hype playlist — the album is impressive even with its occasional blunders."

Reanna Cruz of NPR wrote that the album is the "final death knell of bubblegum hyperpop. Throughout the thirty-minute record, Ru somehow manages to commodify and repackage the sounds of almost every single musician who has made an impact on queer internet communities over the past several years, including but not limited to Charli XCX, Shygirl, Kim Petras, Namasenda and the late Sophie, who is rolling in her grave at the familiar fruit production on a song named 'Pretty Pretty Gang Gang'."

The album won the 2022 WOWIE Stream Queen Award for Best Album, presented at RuPaul's DragCon LA.

== Track listing ==
All tracks are written by RuPaul Charles and Frederick Miñano.

Mamaru track listing
No.	Title	Producer(s)	Length
1.	"Just What They Want"	Skeltal Ki	3:12
2.	"Catwalk" (featuring Skeltal Ki)	Skeltal Ki	2:55
3.	"Smile"		2:37
4.	"Fascination"		2:44
5.	"Blame It on the Edit"	Skeltal Ki	3:02
6.	"Who Is She"		3:06
7.	"Pretty Pretty Gang Gang"		2:56
8.	"Mother of the House"		3:29
9.	"Catwalk" (Reprise)		2:45
10.	"Queendom"		3:26
Total length:			30:12

Notes

- "Smile" contains an interpolation of "anthems" by Charli XCX.
