= The RuPaul Show =

- Logo of the show
- Genre: Talk show, variety
- Directed by: Joe Palagreco; Mike Simon
- Presented by: RuPaul; Michelle Visage
- Country of origin: United States
- Original language: English
- No. of seasons: 2
- No. of episodes: 100

Production
- Executive producers: Fenton Bailey; Randy Barbato; Lauren Zalaznick
- Production locations: New York City, New York
- Camera setup: Multi-camera
- Running time: 22–24 minutes

Original release
- Network: VH1
- Release: October 12, 1996 – September 23, 1998

The RuPaul Show is an American talk, variety show that premiered on VH1 in 1996. Hosted by the drag performer RuPaul, the show had many famous musical guests and was notable as being one of the first national television programs in the United States hosted by an openly gay host. Michelle Visage, a radio personality and former singer, was the show's co-host.

== Overview ==
The show features RuPaul interviewing various celebrity guests ranging from musicians, actors, and pop culture figures. In addition to interviews, the series also featured comedy skits, and comedic field reports. RuPaul would also perform his favorite songs along with two male dancers. Diana Ross, a frequent inspiration for RuPaul, made a rare appearance on the show.
