= Lior Rosner =

American-Israeli composer

Lior Rosner is an Israeli-born film, TV and classical music composer, conductor.

Rosner created the theme for The Ellen DeGeneres Show. He was a nominee for an International Film Music Critics Association nominee award for “They’ll Remember You” an orchestral accompanied choral showpiece for the end titles from the movie Valkyrie.

== Early life ==
Born in Israel, Rosner graduated with a degree in music composition and theory graduate from the Jerusalem Academy of Music And Dance He moved from to Los Angeles, where he studied graduate music at UCLA, and conducting at the USC Thornton School of Music.

Lior’s film scoring career began as a staff composer at Fox Entertainment. He provided scores for over 200 episodes of children TV shows and movies. After this, he became a freelance composer, scoring for Disney/ABC. Rosner then created the theme and interstitial music for The Ellen DeGeneres Show.

Rosner lives and works in Los Angeles, California.

== Film and TV scores ==
Lior Rosner has contributed music and orchestration to several film scores, including X-Men: Days Of Future Past, Valkyrie, Little Fockers, Cirque du Freak: The Vampire’s Assistant, and Fantastic Four, among others. His choral composition “They’ll Remember You,” featured in Valkyrie and starring Tom Cruise, was nominated for a World Soundtrack Award and has been performed as part of the contemporary choral repertoire. Rosner film credits also include original scores for Seconds Apart, Geography Club, Sins of Our Youth, The Wedding Doll, and The Losers, produced by Joel Silver.

His television work includes the Netflix animated series Q-Force, the Netflix series AJ and the Queen, and NBC’s revival of Will & Grace, for which Rosner reimagined the show’s theme and received multiple ASCAP Awards. His television credits also include the theme for The Ellen DeGeneres Show, as well as the series Heroes and Villains: The Secret History of Comics, Battle Creek, Forever, and CNN’s The History of Comedy.

Rosner created scores for The Odds, The Losers, Battle Creek, The Pee-Wee Herman Show on Broadway and additional music for the ABC show Forever.

Rosner is a composer for film, television, and the concert stage. His orchestral work Sugar Plum on the Run, released on Sony Classical, is a contemporary sequel to The Nutcracker and features the Royal Philharmonic Orchestra with narration by Jeremy Irons. In addition, Rosner has provided arrangements and orchestrations for organizations and artists including the San Francisco Symphony, the BBC Symphony Orchestra, and Michael Feinstein.

In addition to his work as a composer, Lior Rosner is a founding member of the electronic music collective KUMMERSPECK. The group has collaborated on recording projects with artists including Philip Glass, Blondie, and RuPaul. Music by the collective has also been featured in television and film advertising campaigns.

== Video game, trailers and commercials ==
Rosner wrote the score for Sony video games SOCOM Fight Team Bravo 3 and Syphon Filter Dark Mirror.

Rosner, a former member of X-Ray Dog, also created and music for film and television trailers including, Games Of Thrones, The Imitation Game, Paddington, Harry Potter and The Deathly Hallows, The Zoo Keeper, Yogi Bear, Jack And Jill, Speed Racer, Walk the Line, Dreamer, Atonement, and Toy Story 3.

Rosner has done music commercial brands: Mercedes Benz, Campari and Hitachi.

== Classical music works ==
Rosner is the curator of An American Renaissance, a new concert program featuring orchestral settings of songs by Florence Price and Billy Strayhorn, drawing on music from both the Harlem Renaissance and the Chicago Black Renaissance.

In addition to his music scoring career, Rosner continues to enjoy writing classical music. His most recent recording, released on Bridge Records, is the album, Awake and Dream, featuring Soprano Janai Brugger, violinist Katia Popov (concertmaster of the Hollywood Bowl Orchestra), pianist Steven Vanhauwaert, The Hollywood Studio Symphony with Rosner as composer, conductor and pianist.,

Also released is In Time of Silver Rain, Seven Poems by Langston Hughes, also features Janai Brugger and Rosner on piano. Rosner’s classical works have been performed live in concert by the Armadillo String Quartet, the Pacific composers forum and most recently by the Kaleidoscope Orchestra.
