= Eric Kupper =

American musician

Eric Kupper is an American keyboardist, arranger, songwriter, remix artist, DJ, and record producer of French descent.

== Biography ==
Eric Kupper began playing in bands in his formative years, and got his real start in the mid-1980s working as a keyboardist, guitarist, and songwriter for such producer/remixers as David Morales, Frankie Knuckles, Arthur Baker, Mark Kamins, Justin Strauss, Peter Rauhofer, and Richie Jones. Since 1986 he has played on, remixed, and/or produced over 2,000 records for artists spanning all contemporary musical genres. His work in the mid-to-late 1980s/early 1990s, especially his work with Def Mix Productions, is considered to be part of the foundation for house music as it exists today. He released an album under his own name, From the Deep, in 1995.

As a remixer he has worked with Ayumi Hamasaki, Garbage, Usher, Alicia Keys, BT, Diana Ross, Whitney Houston, Marianne Faithfull, Goldfrapp, Cher, Janet Jackson, Shakira, Enrique Iglesias, Sheryl Crow, Lenny Kravitz, Kylie Minogue, Korn, Moloko, Smash Mouth, New Order, Yoko Ono, Dido, Brandy, Depeche Mode, Curtis Mayfield, the Brand New Heavies, Robert Palmer, Afrika Bambaata & Soulsonic Force, Kate Bush, 808 State, Jessica Simpson, Anastacia, Donna Summer, PM Dawn, Miley Cyrus, and RuPaul, among numerous others.

Kupper has also worked as a producer and/or mixer for many projects outside of the realm of dance music. Some artists he has worked with in this area include John Wesley Harding, Julee Cruise, Róisín Murphy, PM Dawn, the Butterflies of Love, Saint Etienne, McQueen, Love Bites, Ofra Haza, Laura Pausini, and Gloria Estefan.

He has released three albums under the name "Eric Kupper Presents K-Scope". The most recent was called Electrikiss, released in January 2009 after a ten-year hiatus. Kupper also started the Hysteria Records label.

As a DJ, Kupper has played and continues to perform all around the world. He was one of the first five Hed Kandi DJs before leaving the label in 2006.
