= Worlds (Porter Robinson album) =

Studio album by Porter Robinson
- Released: August 12, 2014
- Genre: Electropop
- Length: 57:49
- Label: Astralwerks
- Producer: Porter Robinson

Porter Robinson chronology
Spitfire (2011)	Worlds (2014)	Nurture (2021)

Singles from Worlds
- 1. "Sea of Voices" Released: March 2, 2014; 2. "Sad Machine" Released: May 13, 2014; 3. "Lionhearted" Released: June 17, 2014; 4. "Flicker" Released: July 29, 2014

Worlds is the debut studio album by the American electronic music producer Porter Robinson, released on August 12, 2014, by Astralwerks. Initially known for his heavier bass-centric production, Robinson became increasingly dissatisfied with the electronic dance music (EDM) genre, believing it limited his artistic expression. In 2012, Robinson released his first song with a greater emphasis on melody, "Language", and decided thereafter to prioritize aesthetic and emotional qualities in his work. He was inspired by media that evoked nostalgia for his childhood, and wrote music integrating elements taken from anime, films, and sounds from 1990s video games.

Robinson's primary inspirations for Worlds were Daft Punk's Discovery (2001) and Kanye West's Graduation (2007). Critics described the work as electropop, noting similarities to the styles of M83 and Passion Pit. In late 2013, a bidding war broke out among record labels over which of them would release the record. The album was preceded by four singles: "Sea of Voices", "Sad Machine", "Lionhearted", and "Flicker", and promoted with a tour in North America and Europe.

Worlds was well received by most critics, who praised it as innovative and forecasted a promising career for Robinson, though others felt the record lacked coherence or was unexciting. Retrospectively, the album was noted for its impact on the EDM scene. It charted in the United States, the United Kingdom, Australia, and the Netherlands. Following Worlds's positive reception, Robinson felt pressured to write an appropriate follow-up work. As a result, he experienced a period of writer's block and depression, leading to the seven-year gap until his next studio album, Nurture (2021).

== Background and development ==
I feel more strongly about this music that I've written for this album than anything I've ever done in my life. I think it would be doing myself a disservice not to say that overtly. If I didn't totally believe in this, then no one would ever hear it.

— Porter Robinson, 2013

Porter Robinson was initially known for his electro and complextro music, such as the 2010 single "Say My Name" and the 2011 extended play Spitfire; Robinson described his initial sound as "very heavy" and "bass-aggressive". "Say My Name" topped Beatport's electro house chart, while Spitfire caused the website to crash after being promoted by Skrillex and Tiësto.

Throughout 2012, Robinson performed at major electronic dance music (EDM) festivals, but gradually became dissatisfied with the genre. He mentioned having four or five intense anxiety attacks that year while performing, at one point shouting that "dance music is terrible" during a show. Robinson came to believe that the genre limited his expression; in an interview with NME, he said "[EDM] is entertainment, it's not really art". (Note: Robinson later retracted this statement in a 2024 interview with The Independent, saying "That was so wrongheaded. EDM is clearly art ... that video was me trying to escape something and being a bit of a dickhead honestly".) Robinson felt that by attempting to add DJ-friendly and dance-oriented features to his music, he frequently compromised and diminished the quality of his songs.

Robinson conceived the idea for Worlds in 2012 following the release of "Language", his first song to have a greater emphasis on melody. Although it was a departure from his earlier sound, "Language" was accepted by audiences, surprising Robinson. As a result, he decided to prioritize "beauty" and "emotion" in his music, which became his first principles for Worlds. He also considered it necessary to be "sincere" and "honest". Rather than creating club-oriented music, he chose to produce the music he wanted to hear and believed should exist. In 2013, he released "Easy" with Mat Zo, which Andy Kellman of AllMusic characterized as one of the standout commercial dance singles of the year.

Robinson moved to his parents' home in Chapel Hill, North Carolina, and spent a year revisiting soundtracks of Nintendo 64 video games from the 1990s and 2000s. Robinson produced the album in FL Studio, and wrote around 50 tracks for the album, which were later narrowed to 12 on the final tracklist. In a May 2013 interview, Robinson said he had set July as the deadline to finish the album, and that the title still had not been chosen. When Robinson signed with Astralwerks in November 2013, the album was nearly complete. Robinson collaborated with Spanish illustrator David Aguado to create the album's artwork and design.

== Composition ==
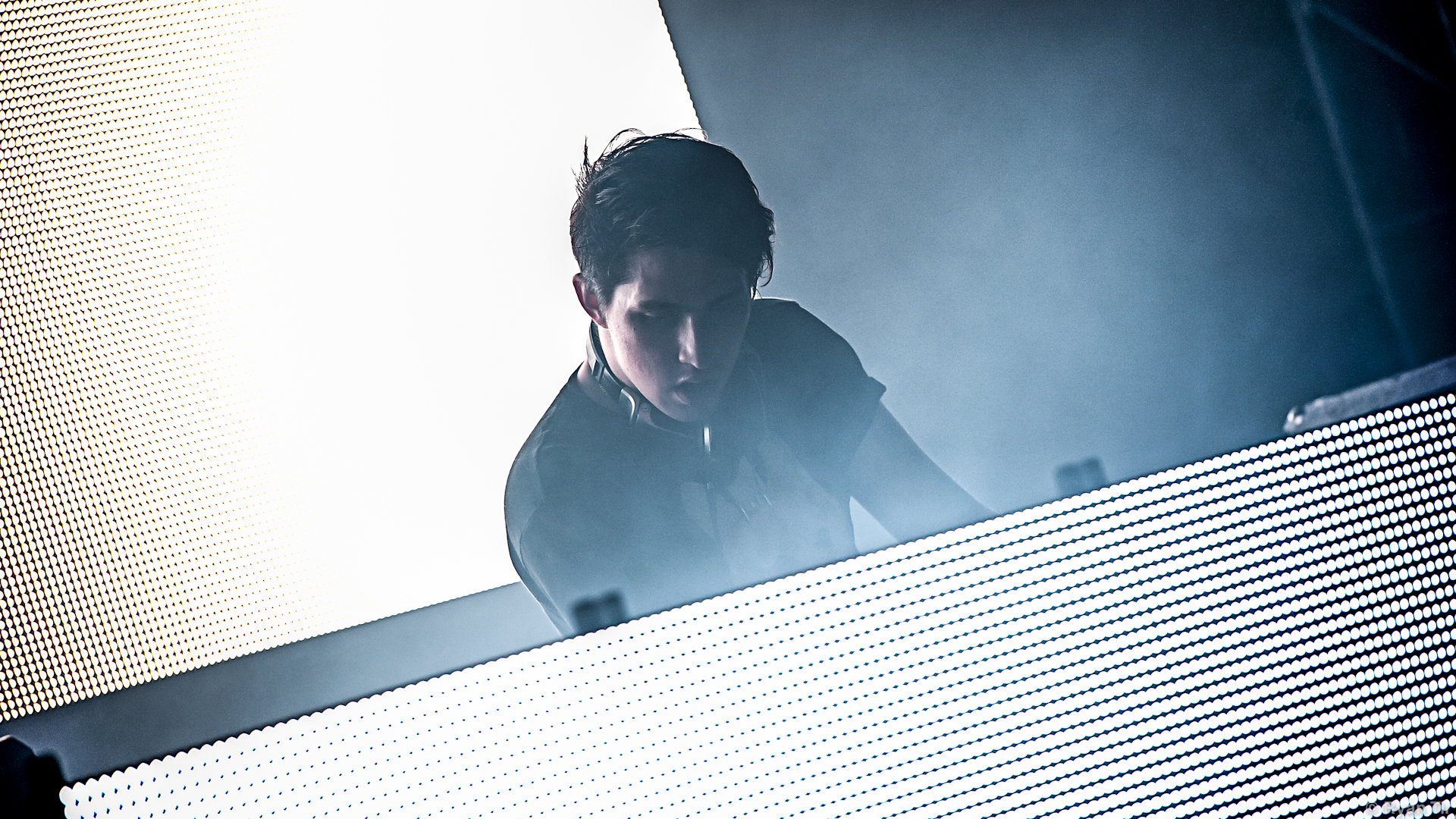
Robinson performing in 2013

Robinson was inspired by themes of fantasy, escapism, fiction, and nostalgia; he said that Worlds is not associated with, nor has a place in, reality. Robinson incorporated elements from video games, anime, and movies. His experiences with massively multiplayer online role-playing games and associated nostalgia were an influence. He admired the worlds these games – Star Wars Galaxies (2003) in particular – provided and was affected by how dwindling player bases and bankruptcies eventually brought them offline. These themes influenced Robinson to title the album Worlds.

Robinson used General MIDI sounds that resembled the music of Nintendo 64 and PlayStation video games, including those he played while growing up in the 1990s, such as The Legend of Zelda: Ocarina of Time (1998), which evoked childhood nostalgia for Robinson. By emulating the "slight[ly] sad vibe" of the stories that inspired him, Robinson wanted to give the album a retrospective and emotional atmosphere. Daft Punk's Discovery (2001), an album Robinson considers the best of all time, was his biggest influence for the record, with Kanye West's Graduation (2007) in second. Multiple critics wrote that the album's sound resembled M83 (Note: Attributed to multiple references:) and Passion Pit.

Larry Fitzmaurice of Pitchfork said that Worlds is clearly electropop, and Megan Buerger of Billboard wrote that the album combines ambient, disco and electropop. Vice's Elissa Stolman felt that several tracks on the album were inspired by new wave. While Robinson intended to stray from EDM, the album still kept some of its elements; some critics described the album's sound as "post-EDM". Sharon O'Connell of Uncut said that Robinson mixed EDM tropes and nu-rave with M83-like synth-pop and "bangers" by Daft Punk and Justice. Conversely, Buerger wrote that bass drops and dance-like rhythms were substituted by "delicate chord progressions and deep, forceful synths". Barry Walters of Wondering Sound wrote that, in contrast to the typically higher tempos of EDM, much of Worlds is at a lower, ballad-like speed.

== Songs ==
=== Tracks 1–5 ===
Worlds opens with "Divinity", which contains vocals by Canadian singer Amy Millan, from the bands Stars and Broken Social Scene. Robinson chose the track as the opener because it was the first he wrote with a slower tempo and more emotional chords, a style he considered representative of Worlds. Tatiana Cirisano of Billboard wrote that there is a large contrast between the intro and chorus; while the former contains "underwater-sounding", smooth vocals, the latter contains a "cacophony" of cymbals and glitch-like sounds reminiscent of video games. Barry Walters of Wondering Sound said that it features common characteristics of EDM, such as a powerful beat, dense layers of synthesizers, and an airy female vocal, while Elissa Stolman of Vice described the track as an indie-electronic "festival rave anthem", with synths that resembled M83's "Midnight City" (2011). Alternatively, Rupert Howe of Q found similarities to electronica and M83-like space rock.

"Sad Machine"
On "Sad Machine", Robinson duets with Avanna, a Vocaloid voice. Cirisano wrote that the song's "glitchy, techy" elements were representative of Worlds and its connection to video games.

The next track, "Sad Machine", was the first song for which Robinson had recorded his own vocals. Describing it as a "duet between a lonely robot girl and the human boy", Robinson employed Avanna, a Vocaloid voice, as the song's lead singer. Larry Fitzmaurice of Pitchfork considered it one among other tracks on Worlds which resembled the "high-wire synth-pop fantasias" of Passion Pit, as it contained a mid-tempo instrumental and "starry-eyed melodic structure". Las Vegas Weekly's Mike Prevatt identified inspirations from M83 and Sigur Rós. Lucas Villa of AXS described the track as "heroic and awe-inspiring" and felt that it evoked the "dreamier" elements of electronic music. The third song, "Years of War", features Breanne Düren of Owl City and Sean Caskey of Last Dinosaurs. Pursuing a "cutesy synth-pop thing", Robinson said it was the hardest he had ever worked on a song. It leans into electropop, synth-pop, and new wave. The song's main instrument is a trance synth, which Stolman felt contrasted with the song's retro elements, such as a boom-clap rhythm and "sepia-toned synths".

The song is followed by "Flicker", which Robinson considered one of his proudest moments on the album. The song begins with a calm disco beat reminiscent of old video games and a faint bassline building in the background. A female voice enters, speaking chopped-up Japanese phrases. Prevatt said that the song uses a classic hip hop breakbeat before the chorus, which he described as an "emotional payoff". Just after the two-minute mark, the song switches to a bass-heavy atmosphere, and Buerger comments that Robinson retains his "invitation to the party" in spite of the song's experimental elements. She described the song as the most dynamic on the album. Garrett Kamps of Spin identified melodic similarities with Boards of Canada. "Fresh Static Snow", the fifth track on the album, also uses Avanna. Robinson said that the song focuses on his feelings of loneliness and the idea of soulmates. Consequence of Sound's Derek Staples found the song's "ethereal electro vibes" to be reminiscent of The Glitch Mob and The M Machine. Stolman described it as a "coiled, metallic guitar squall" which goes to "midrange bass grit" culminating in a heavenly breakdown with melancholy robotic vocals.

=== Tracks 6–12 ===
The album's sixth track, "Polygon Dust", is a collaboration with Lemaitre, a band Robinson was fond of. Its main element is a trance synth. Stolman described the track as one of the safest of the album, containing natural vocals as opposed to "Sad Machine" and "Fresh Static Snow", as well as calmer synths. It is followed by "Hear the Bells", which features Imaginary Cities. It is based on one of the band's existing songs, "Bells of Cologne". Robinson felt that the song is where he sings with the greatest stage presence. Kamps thought the vocal choir was "fantastical and defiantly cheery", while Stolman wrote that the song contains Givers-like layered indie vocals and emotional lyrics. Fitzmaurice said that "Hear the Bells" has a good amount of "rocket fuel" due to its dynamic electronics and anthemic synthesizers.

"Natural Light", Worlds's eighth track, is an interlude. Robinson enjoyed the track due to its intelligent dance music passages inspired by artists such as Aphex Twin and Venetian Snares. Stolman commented that, despite its driving bass, sharp drum hits, vocal fragments, and sparkling keys, the track could be called minimal in the context of the album. The ninth track is "Lionhearted", which features Urban Cone. It was one of the first tracks Robinson wrote for the album, describing it as "anthemic". Critics wrote that this was the album's first display of a faster tempo. Kamps described the sound as "exuberant pop" and Prevatt felt there were similarities to the styles of Holy Ghost! and Passion Pit. The next song, "Sea of Voices", went through multiple iterations before its release. It is a five-minute orchestral track that contain no drums in its first minutes, being only composed of synths reminiscent of atmospheric big room. Noting the late introduction of beats, Buerger said the track has "the emotions of a tear-jerking blockbuster". Kamps found the build-up similar to ones by Sigur Rós.

"Fellow Feeling" is Worlds's penultimate track. In a criticism of EDM composition, Robinson starkly juxtaposed what he felt was "beautiful and serene" with aggressive and violent elements. Sharon O'Connell of Uncut felt that the opening section was reminiscent of chamber music, that was described by Villa as "cinematic" and Walters as "symphonic". Further into the song, a voice says, "Now, please, hear what I hear", and a strong bass enters. Walters claimed the track is interrupted by aggressive dubstep elements which O'Connell described as electro funk that had been chopped and screwed. Villa named it the album's most climactic moment. The final track, "Goodbye to a World", is the third to use Avanna. Robinson wanted the feeling of a "beautiful apocalypse" for the song. It has lullaby-like moments contrasted with sections that Staples found similar to breakcore and Stolman characterized as "fist-pumping brutality".

== Release and promotion ==
Worlds's logomark, which The Fader's Duncan Cooper felt Robinson had "made [...] his trademark".

Following a bidding war over the record, it was announced on November 14, 2013, that Robinson had signed a deal with Astralwerks; Worlds would be released through their Capitol Records imprint in the US and their Virgin EMI Records imprint internationally. Robinson chose Astralwerks because it was not an EDM label. On February 10, 2014, Robinson revealed the album's title in a video that featured a robotic voice repeating worlds for ten hours. When the video was released, Robinson stated that he disliked marketing campaigns that were "wishy-washy", and attempted to create all of his work with a clear intent.

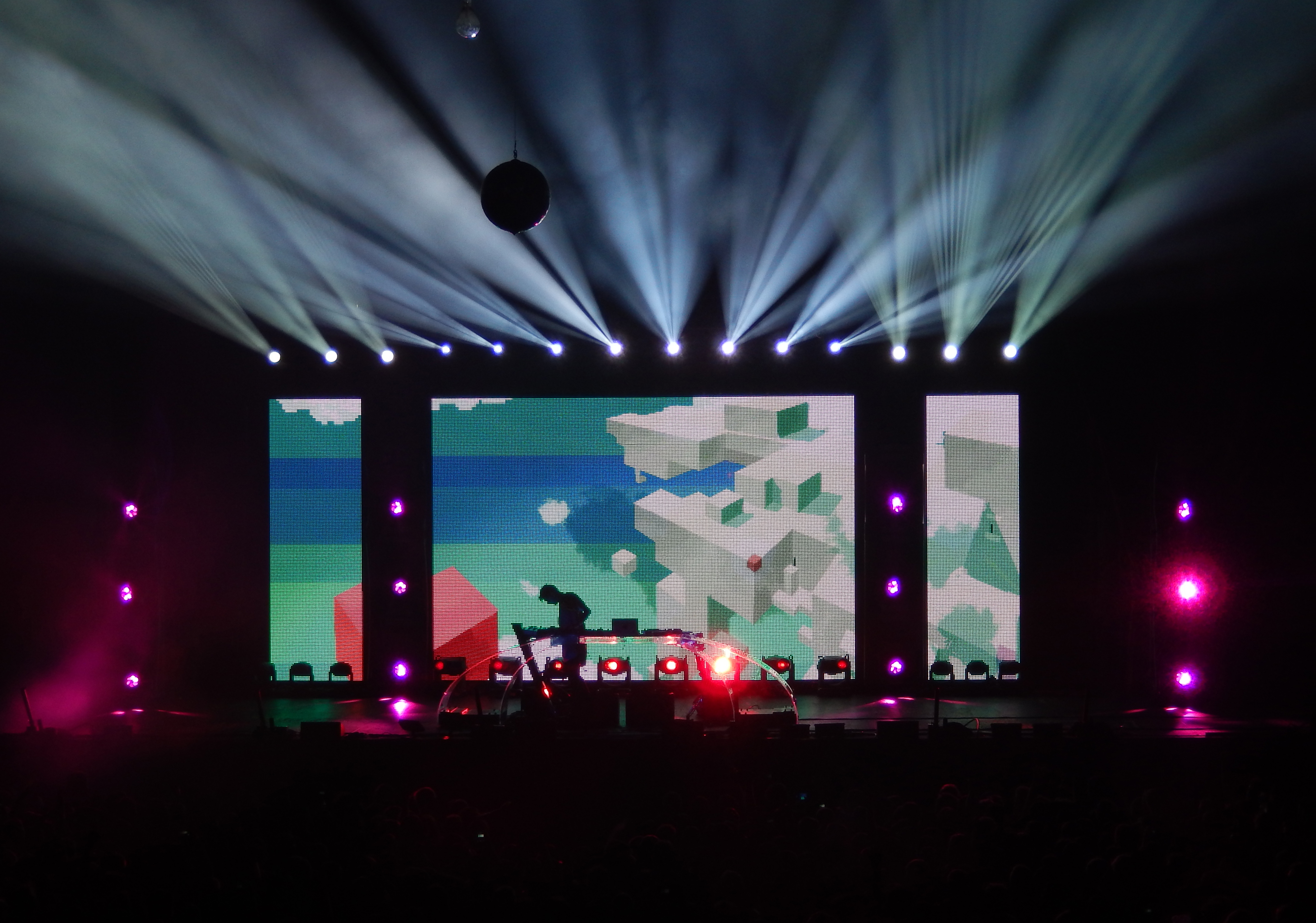
Robinson performing on the Worlds Live Tour in 2014

Astralwerks wanted to release "Shepherdess" (Note: "Shepherdess" does not appear on the album but on the B-side of the "Lionhearted" 7-inch single, which was included in the album's limited edition box set..) as the album's first single, which Robinson described as the "most EDM thing" he had made since 2011. However, he decided to lead with the song he felt was "the least accessible to fans of dance music", "Sea of Voices". The single was released on March 2, shortly before the 86th Academy Awards. "Sea of Voices" became a trending topic on Twitter during the event, and received positive reactions from audiences, contrary to Robinson's expectations. Though originally intending "Flicker" to be the album's second single, Robinson changed it to "Sad Machine" three days beforehand, which he claimed caused "mayhem" at the label. "Sad Machine" was the last song written for the album, and Robinson felt certain it should be the next release upon its completion. "Sad Machine" was premiered by The Fader on May 12, 2014, and made available elsewhere a day later. A lyric video was released on May 21.

On June 3, Stereogum premiered Worlds's third single, "Lionhearted", which features Swedish band Urban Cone. It also debuted at BBC Radio 1. The single was officially released on June 17, accompanied by a music video in which Mixmag's Carré Orenstein described Robinson and a group of women "wreak[ing] havoc around the city streets, resulting in an eruption of [color]". "Flicker" was premiered on July 28 by Vogue, being officially released the next day as Worlds's fourth and final single. An official music video was released on August 14. The video is set on a train and views glitchy effects occurring on a passing Japanese landscape through the window.

In July, Robinson announced a limited edition box set of Worlds containing bonus remixes and tracks. On August 4, the album was premiered by NPR as part of their "First Listen" series. It was fully released on August 12, 2014. From August 28 to October 18, Robinson performed on a North American tour for Worlds, which later extended to Europe. He once again took inspiration from fictional universes for its visuals, which featured video game-like, pixelated worlds on large LED displays. The visuals were managed by Imaginary Light Network.

On October 2, 2015, Robinson released Worlds Remixed, a remix album involving artists and producers such as Mat Zo, Odesza, Sleepy Tom, Galimatias, and San Holo. As with Worlds, David Aguado illustrated several pieces for the remix album.

A tenth anniversary edition of the album was released on vinyl in 2024. The pressing featured a previously unreleased song, "Hollowheart", which Robinson had intended to appear on Worlds but did not submit in time to be included. A live album featuring recordings of Robinson's performance at the 2019 Second Sky festival was released concurrently.

== Critical reception ==
Professional ratings
Aggregate scores
Source	Rating
AnyDecentMusic?	6.4/10
Metacritic	63/100
Review scores
Source	Rating
AllMusic	3/5 stars
Alternative Press	2.5/5 stars
Consequence of Sound	C
Las Vegas Weekly	3.5/5 stars
Pitchfork	6.9/10
Q	3/5 stars
Rolling Stone	3.5/5 stars
Spin	8/10
Uncut	6/10
Wondering Sound	2.5/5 stars

According to review aggregator Metacritic, Worlds received "generally favorable reviews" based on a weighted average score of 63 out of 100 from 8 critics scores, while, on AnyDecentMusic?, the album received a rating of 6.4 out of 10 from 7 critic scores.

Some reviewers praised Worlds as innovative. Lucas Villa of AXS felt that Robinson exceeded expectations by crafting a complete experience, venturing boldly into uncharted territory for DJs, while Garrett Kamps of Spin said that "it's pretty hard to deny this kid has done something amazing, no matter what you call it". Writing for Billboard, Megan Buerger thought Worlds was "the next frontier" for Robinson, praising its focus on the individual instead of the collective. She described the album as "ideal headphone music", while Rolling Stone's Elissa Stolman wrote that it "manages to retain the thrilling rush of emotions that the best raves inspire", despite not fully sounding like EDM. Las Vegas Weekly writer Mike Prevatt wrote that the album was "a necessary crosscurrent to the swells of EDM" even if it did not catalyze a new musical trend.

Although some reviewers were critical of the album, they acknowledged it was evident Robinson had a promising career ahead of him. Andy Kellman of AllMusic felt that it was clear Robinson was yet to become accustomed to creating music outside the context of raves due to the album's "several clumsier moments". Kellman, when considering Robinson's ambitions and accomplishments with the work, forecasted a "fascinating" career in his future. While Pitchfork's Larry Fitzmaurice did not find Worlds's style to be inventive, he admired the transition Robinson was making and wrote that his career seemed "extremely promising". Sharon O'Connell of Uncut felt that many characterized Robinson as a stylistic pioneer, a view she disagreed with, but also wrote that "youth is on Robinson's side." Q's Rupert Howe said that Robinson had fulfilled his reputation as an accomplished producer, but that, while having different aspirations than his peers, he "hasn't completely freed himself of their influence".

Some reviewers thought that the record lacked coherence; Consequence of Sound's Derek Staples felt that while reinventing EDM was a noble idea, Robinson's execution was weak, and Worlds more resembled a "remix compilation" than a proper album. Others found the album unexciting. Samuel Tolzmann of Spectrum Culture wrote that Worlds ultimately embraces generic conventions and that the expectation for the album to redefine the genre highlighted more about the stagnation of this style of EDM than Robinson's music's complexity or creativity. Barry Walters of Wondering Sound said that little of Worlds was memorable, suggesting that Robinson's personal universe felt notably derivative.

Worlds was considered the second best album of the year by Thump and appeared in a list of best albums of the year by Complex.

== Commercial performance ==
In the United States, Worlds debuted at number one on Billboard's Top Dance/Electronic Albums, holding that position for a week. The album spent a total of 23 weeks on the chart. On Billboard 200, the magazine's main album chart, it peaked at number 18 and spent a total of seven weeks on the list. In the United Kingdom, the album debuted and peaked at number 13 on the Official Charts Company's UK Dance Albums and at 86 on the company's main chart, UK Albums Chart. The album also charted at number 13 in Australia and 96 in the Netherlands.

== Legacy ==
Worlds had a notable impact on the EDM scene. John Ochoa of DJ Mag described it as a "breakthrough" that precipitated a wider shift in the electronic music industry, allowing for "softer" and "dreamier" music in the genre. According to Ochoa, "Worlds was Robinson's attempt to change the course of an entire genre and scene. He succeeded." Similarly, Kat Bein of Billboard said that the album influenced "a generation of producers to make pretty, emotional dance music", as well as attempt live performances. According to Paper's Matt Moen, a wave of artists would cite Worlds as a major influence, and Krystal Rodriguez and Bein of Billboard said that Worlds and its tour became a model for a generation of young producers to emulate. In 2018, Mariah Carey's single "GTFO" sampled "Goodbye to a World". In November 2019, Billboard staff ranked Worlds as the fifteenth greatest dance album of the 2010s and as the ninety-seventh greatest album of the decade more broadly.

As a result of the album's positive reception, Robinson had set high expectations for himself, stating in 2018 that he felt significant pressure to create something similar to a follow-up. This caused him to go through an extended period of writer's block and depression, during which he released very little music. Robinson's second studio album, Nurture, was released on April 23, 2021, seven years after Worlds. His experiences with his mental health during this time were reflected in Nurture's lyrics.

== Track listing ==
All tracks are written by Porter Robinson, with additional writers noted.

No.	Title	Writer(s)	Length
1.	"Divinity" (featuring Amy Millan)		6:08
2.	"Sad Machine"		5:50
3.	"Years of War" (featuring Breanne Düren and Sean Caskey)	Breanne Düren; Sean Caskey	3:56
4.	"Flicker"		4:39
5.	"Fresh Static Snow"		5:58
6.	"Polygon Dust" (featuring Lemaitre)	Ketil Jansen; Ulrik Denizou Lund	3:29
7.	"Hear the Bells" (featuring Imaginary Cities)	Marti Sarbit; Rusty Matyas	4:46
8.	"Natural Light"		2:21
9.	"Lionhearted" (featuring Urban Cone)	Benjamin Swardlick; Andrew Coenen; Eric Luttrell; Emil Gustafsson; Rasmus Flyckt	4:26
10.	"Sea of Voices"	Düren	4:58
11.	"Fellow Feeling"		5:50
12.	"Goodbye to a World"		5:28
Total length:			57:49

10th anniversary edition bonus track
No.	Title	Length
13.	"Hollowheart" (featuring Amy Millan)	3:50
Total length:		61:39

Limited edition box set: Remix CD
No.	Title	Length
1.	"Sea of Voices (RAC Mix)"	6:08
2.	"Sad Machine (Anamanaguchi Remix)"	4:29
3.	"Lionhearted (Arty Remix)" (featuring Urban Cone)	5:17
4.	"Lionhearted (The Alexanders Remix)" (featuring Urban Cone)	5:56
5.	"Lionhearted (Giraffage Remix)" (featuring Urban Cone)	3:59
6.	"Lionhearted (Urban Cone Remix)" (featuring Urban Cone)	3:26
Total length:		29:15

Limited edition box set: "Lionhearted" 7-inch single
No.	Title	Length
1.	"Lionhearted" (featuring Urban Cone)	4:26
2.	"Shepherdess"	7:16
Total length:		11:42

Worlds Remixed
No.	Title	Length
1.	"Divinity (Odesza Remix)" (featuring Amy Millan)	5:26
2.	"Sad Machine (Deon Custom Remix)"	5:06
3.	"Years of War (Rob Mayth Remix)" (featuring Breanne Düren and Sean Caskey)	3:55
4.	"Flicker (Mat Zo Remix)"	4:55
5.	"Fresh Static Snow (Last Island Remix)"	3:12
6.	"Polygon Dust (Sleepy Tom Remix)" (featuring Lemaitre)	4:07
7.	"Hear the Bells (Electric Mantis Remix)" (featuring Imaginary Cities)	4:45
8.	"Natural Light (San Holo Remix)"	2:55
9.	"Lionhearted (Point Point Remix)" (featuring Urban Cone)	3:25
10.	"Sea of Voices (Galimatias Remix)"	3:01
11.	"Fellow Feeling (Slumberjack Remix)"	4:51
12.	"Goodbye to a World (Chrome Sparks Remix)"	6:13
Total length:		51:51

=== Notes ===
- "Sad Machine", "Fresh Static Snow", and "Goodbye to a World" feature vocals from Avanna, a Vocaloid voice.
- "Flicker" contains samples from Waiting in the Summer, produced by the Natsumachi Production Committee.
- "Hear the Bells" contains samples from "Bells of Cologne" by Imaginary Cities.
- "Sea of Voices" features uncredited vocals from Breanne Düren.
- "Fellow Feeling" features uncredited vocals from Amanda Lee.

== Personnel ==
Adapted from the CD liner notes.

- Porter Robinson – production, engineering, mixing, additional drum programming
- Mike Marsh – mastering
- Simon Davey – mastering
- Karen Thompson – mastering
- Nicole Frantz – art direction
- David Aguado – artwork, design
- Randall Leddy – layout

== Charts ==
Chart performance for Worlds
Chart (2014)	Peak position
Australian Albums (ARIA)	13
Dutch Albums (Album Top 100)	96
UK Albums (OCC)	86
UK Dance Albums (Official Charts)	13
US Billboard 200	18
US Top Dance Albums (Billboard)	1
