= Mat Zo discography =

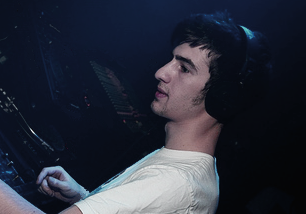
- Mat Zo performing in 2010
- Studio albums: 3
- EPs: 17
- Compilation albums: 1
- Singles: 36

The discography of British electronic music producer and DJ Mat Zo comprises three studio albums, one compilation album, thirty six singles, and seventeen extended plays.

== Albums ==
=== Studio albums ===
List of studio albums, with selected chart positions
Title	Album details	Peak chart positions			
Title	Album details	US	US Dance	US Heat	UK
Damage Control	Released: 5 November 2013; Label: Anjunabeats, Astralwerks; Formats: CD, digital download	149	7	1	192
Self Assemble	Released: 25 March 2016; Label: Mad Zoo; Formats: CD, digital download	—	7	—	—
Illusion of Depth	Released: 9 October 2020; Label: Anjunabeats; Formats: CD, vinyl, digital download	—	—	—	—
"—" denotes items which were not released in that territory or did not chart.

=== Compilation albums ===
Title	Album details
Anjunabeats Presents Mat Zo 01	Released: 24 January 2012; Label: Anjunabeats; Formats: Digital download

== Extended plays ==
List of extended plays, showing title, date released, labels and track listing
Title	Details	Track listing
Foot and Mouth	Released: 17 March 2007; Label: Praesul Records	List: 1. "Foot and Mouth"; 2. "Pay Attention"; 3. "Rasahatan"
Rush / Defined	Released: 10 November 2008; Label: Anjunabeats	List: 1. "Rush"; 2. "Defined"
Aurus / The Price Of Oil	Released: 16 February 2009; Label: Anjunabeats	List: 1. "Aurus"; 2. "The Price Of Oil"
Lucky Strike / Synapse Dynamics	Released: 23 February 2009; Label: Anjunabeats	List: 1. "Lucky Strike"; 2. "Synapse Dynamics"
Equinox / Subaquatic Dream	Released: 20 April 2009; Label: Soundpiercing	List: 1. "Equinox"; 2. "Subaquatic Dream"
The Fractal Universe / This Is Reality	Released: 22 June 2009; Label: Soundpiercing	List: 1. "The Fractal Universe"; 2. "This Is Reality
Default / Rush 2009	Released: 7 December 2009; Label: Anjunabeats	List: 1. "Default"; 2. "Rush 2009"
Clovers & Acid / What's Left In My Snorty	Released: 18 January 2010; Label: New School Recordings	List: 1. "Clovers & Acid"; 2. "What's Left In My Snorty"
The Lost / The Found	Released: 26 April 2010; Label: Anjunabeats	List: 1. "The Lost"; 2. "The Found"
Near The End / Land Of The Free	Released: 16 August 2010; Label: Anjunabeats	List: 1. "Near The End"; 2. "Land Of The Free"
Back In Time / Millennia	Released: 24 January 2011; Label: Anjunabeats	List: 1. "Back In Time"; 2. "Millennia"
The Bipolar	Released: 13 February 2012; Label: Anjunabeats	List: 1. "Bipolar"; 2. "It's Yours"; 3. "Ring It On"; 4. "Yoyo Ma"
The Up Down Left Right	Released: 11 August 2014; Label: Mad Zoo	List: 1. "Get Down 2 Get Up" (featuring The Knocks); 2. "Left To Right
Mad	Released: 8 September 2016; Label: Mad Zoo	List: 1. "Troglodyte"; 2. "Take It Back" (featuring Foreign Beggars); 3. "MAD
This Is A Mad Zoo House	Released: 14 June 2018; Label: Self-released	List: 1. "Bad Posture"; 2. "Unknown FM"; 3. "Shake The Room"
No Words	Released: 26 October 2018; Label: Anjunabeats	List: 1. "See It When I Believe It"; 2. "Meaning Lost All Words"; 3. "Says Without Going"
Tracing Steps	Released: 18 March 2019; Label: Mad Zoo	List: 1. "Tracing Steps"; 2. "Heat Wave"; 3. "Lust"; 4. "Deep Inside (Extended)

== Singles ==
=== As lead artist ===
Title	Year	Charts	Album
Title	Year	US Dance	Album
"Exodus"	2006	—	Non-album singles
"No Hassle"	2007	—	Non-album singles
"Digital Wasteland" (with Tyler Michaud featuring Marcie)	2008	—	Non-album singles
"Stubby" (with Tyler Michaud)	2008	—	Non-album singles
"Fumar"	2008	—	Non-album singles
"Moonset"	2008	—	Non-album singles
"Nuclear Fusion"	2009	—	Anjunabeats Presents Mat Zo 01
"24 Hours"	2010	—	Anjunabeats Presents Mat Zo 01
"Rebound" (with Arty)	2011	—	Anjunabeats Presents Mat Zo 01
"Superman"	2011	—	Anjunabeats Presents Mat Zo 01
"Frequency Flyer"	2011	—	Anjunabeats Presents Mat Zo 01
"Mozart" (with Arty)	2012	—	Non-album singles
"Loop" (The Essential Unreleased Mix)	2012	—	Non-album singles
"The Sky" (featuring Linnea Schossow)	2012	—	Damage Control
"I Never Knew"	2012	—	Non-album single
"Easy" (with Porter Robinson)	2013	11	Damage Control
"Pyramid Scheme" (featuring Chuck D)	2013	30	Damage Control
"Lucid Dreams"	2013	—	Damage Control
"Only For You" (featuring Rachel K Collier)	2014	—	Damage Control
"Oldskool Trip"	2014	—	Non-album singles
"Real Life"	2014	—	Non-album singles
"Ruffneck Bad Boy"	2014	—	Non-album singles
"Soul Food"	2016	—	Self Assemble
"Sinful" (featuring I See Monstas)	2016	—	Self Assemble
"Revelation Crisis"	2016	—	Non-album singles
"Adrian" (as The Mary Nixons with The Knocks)	2017	—	Non-album singles
"Part I"	2017	—	Non-album singles
"Bad Posture"	2018	—	This Is a Mad Zoo House EP
"Vice"	2018	—	Non-album singles
"Deep Inside"	2019		Non-album singles
"Motivate"	2019	—	This is Mad Zoo
"Emotion Sickness"	2019	—	Non-album single
"Games"	2019	—	UKF10
"Blessed Be Thy Name"	2020	—	This is Mad Too
"The Next Chapter" (featuring GQ)	2020	—	Illusion Of Depth
"Love Songs"	2020	—	Illusion Of Depth
"Problems" (featuring Olan)	2020	—	Illusion Of Depth
"Colours" (featuring Olan)	2020	—	Illusion Of Depth
"Petrushka"	2020	—	Illusion Of Depth
"Reflections" (featuring Olan)	2021	—	Non-album singles
"Always Do" (with Above & Beyond)	2022		Non-album singles
"—" denotes items which were not released in that territory or did not chart.

=== As featuring artist ===
Title	Year	Album
"Get Happy" (The Knocks featuring Mat Zo)	2020	Non-album single

=== As MRSA ===
Title	Year	Label
"Different"	2009	Hospital Records
"Chemicals"	2010	Hospital Records
"Recurring Dream" (with Parallax)	2011	Hospital Records
"Bio Weapon"	2017	Invisible Recordings
"Stuxnet"	2017	Hospital Records
"Push Me Down The Stairs"	2018	Invisible Recordings

=== As Roll Cage ===
Title	Year	Label
"Killer"	2021	Kitsuné Musique

== Remixes ==
List of remixes, showing year released and original artists
Title	Year	Original artist
"In My Life" (Mat Zo Dub)	2007	Lustral
"Love Affair" (Mat Zo Remix)	2007	Shifted Reality
"Music Is For Rich People" (Mat Zo Remix)	2007	Soliquid
"Runaway" (Mat Zo Vocal Remix)	2007	Keenan & Anderson (featuring Tiff Lacey)
"Recoil" (Mat Zo Remix)	2007	Signalrunners
"Fallen Tides" (Mat Zo Vocal Remix)	2008	Mark Pledger vs. Matt Hardwick (featuring Melinda Gareh)
"Driving To Heaven" (Mat Zo Remix)	2008	Tiësto
"Fairway" (Mat Zo Remix)	2008	Waterspark
"Beautiful Day" (Mat Zo Remix)	2008	U2
"Eclipse" (Mat Zo Remix)	2009	Activa presents Solar Movement
"Alive" (Mat Zo Bootleg)	2009	Daft Punk
"Call of Loneliness" (Mat Zo Remix)	2010	Reeves
"Live Forever" (Mat Zo Remix)	2010	Lange (featuring Emma Hewitt)
"Get Outta My Way" (Mat Zo Remix)	2010	Kylie Minogue
"P.U.M.A." (Mat Zo Remix)	2011	Sunny Lax
"Lifted" (Mat Zo Remix)	2011	Tritonal (featuring Christina Soto)
"Be There 4 U" (Mat Zo Remix)	2011	Kyau & Albert
"Thing Called Love" (Mat Zo Remix)	2011	Above & Beyond (featuring Richard Bedford)
"City Nights" (Mat Zo Remix)	2011	Judge Jules
"Perfect Day" (MRSA Remix)	2011	Super8 & Tab (featuring Alyna)
"Electrified" (Mat Zo Electrofied Dub)	2011	Tate & Diamond (featuring Nicolai)
"Love Is Not Enough" (MRZO Remix)	2012	Above & Beyond (featuring Zoë Johnston)
"Alive" (Mat Zo Remix)	2013	Empire of the Sun
"Burn" (Mat Zo Remix)	2013	Ellie Goulding
"Nightmare" (Mat Zo Remix)	2014	Brainbug
"Circle of Life" (Mat Zo Remix)	2014	Elton John, Carmen Twillie and Lebo M
"2wo Butterflies" (Mat Zo Remix)	2014	Erphun
"Lost On The Way Home" (Mat Zo Remix)	2014	Chromeo (featuring Solange)
"Bug a Boo" (Mat Zo Unofficial Remix)	2015	Destiny's Child
"Stronger" (Mat Zo Remix)	2015	Arty (featuring Ray Dalton)
"Collect My Love" (Mat Zo Remix)	2015	The Knocks
"Flicker" (Mat Zo Remix)	2015	Porter Robinson
"Zero" (Mat Zo Bootleg)	2015	The Smashing Pumpkins
"My Love Aside" (Mat Zo Remix)	2016	Matt Lange
"Shelter" (Mat Zo Remix)	2016	Porter Robinson and Madeon
"Mantra" (Mat Zo Remix)	2017	Noisia
"Got The Love" (Kill The Zo Remix)	2017	Big Gigantic (featuring Jennifer Hartswick)
"Talk To Me" (Mat Zo Remix)	2017	Krayysh
"Adagio" (Mat Zo Remix)	2018	Wavedash and Quest
"Another You" (Mat Zo Bootleg)	2018	Breakbot (featuring Ruckazoid)
"Vice" (VIP)	2018	Mat Zo
"Tied Up" (Mat Zo Remix)	2020	Moon Boots
"Rock Your Body Rock" (Mat Zo Remix)	2021	Ferry Corsten
"Dwidala" (Mat Zo Remix)	2021	Rohaan (featuring Yunis)
"Cleansing" (Mat Zo Remix)	2022	Noisia and Former
