= Sea of Voices =

Single by Porter Robinson

from the album Worlds
- Released: March 2, 2014
- Genre: Ambient; electronic dance music
- Length: 4:58
- Label: Astralwerks
- Songwriters: Porter Robinson; Breanne Düren
- Producer: Porter Robinson

Porter Robinson singles chronology
"Easy" (2013)	"Sea of Voices" (2014)	"Sad Machine" (2014)

"Sea of Voices" is a song recorded by American electronic music producer Porter Robinson. It was released on March 2, 2014, as the first single from his debut studio album Worlds (2014), and features uncredited vocals from Breanne Düren. After becoming dissatisfied with the electronic dance music of his prior discography, Robinson decided to alter his style to prioritize aesthetic and emotional qualities in his work. Although Robinson released the song without any leading marketing in an effort to surprise his fans, it was well received by audiences, becoming a trending topic on Twitter and charting on the Billboard US Hot Dance/Electronic Songs. Critics highlighted the song's atmospheric production and unusual compositional structure. Robinson would later cite "Sea of Voices" as an inspiration on his later single "Unfold" (2021).

== Background and composition ==
Years ago, I realized that I wanted to write an album that focused on beauty above all else. [...] I kept trying to write songs that both satisfied me artistically and also could "work" in a DJ set. Nobody ever heard these songs because they sucked and made me miserable. Again and again, I found that making a track "danceable" just meant compromising and ignoring what the song really needed. [...] The fucking watershed moment in writing Worlds was when I realized that I didn't have to write songs for DJs. I realized that my need to be honest with myself and with you was greater than my need to be famous or whatever.

— Porter Robinson

Porter Robinson was initially known for his electro and complextro music, such as the 2010 single "Say My Name" and the 2011 extended play Spitfire. Across 2012, Robinson performed at major electronic dance music (EDM) festivals, but gradually became dissatisfied with the genre. He reported experiencing "four or five fully-blown anxiety attacks onstage" that year, yelling "dance music is terrible" at one of his shows. Following the release of his single "Language" (2012), Robinson set out to write an album he felt was "beautiful and emotional".

Robinson felt that "Sea of Voices" was a song he "worked really hard on" and created several revisions for as a result. Robinson stated that he avoided creating music with the intention of being featured in DJ sets, an approach he felt sabotaged the quality of his work. Beginning with a trance-adjacent production, he eventually pivoted to a sound he felt was more "touching" and "pretty" after writing lyrics for the song. According to him, he gravitated towards "sweeter, cuter, [and] more feminine" voices when writing Worlds (2014). Though he originally used the Vocaloid voice Avanna for "Sea of Voices", Robinson eventually brought on singer Breanne Düren for the song's final version.

== Release and promotion ==
"Sea of Voices" was released on March 2, 2014, as the first single in anticipation of Robinson's debut album Worlds. Robinson stated that his record label Astralwerks intended to release "Shepherdess", (Note: "Shepherdess" does not appear on Worlds but on the B-side of the "Lionhearted" 7-inch single, which was included in the album's limited edition box set. See Worlds (Porter Robinson album) § Track listing.) which he felt was the "most EDM thing" he had recently created, as the lead single. However, he decided to release "Sea of Voices" "out of the blue" to inspire interest and conversation about his change in style instead of creating an extensive marketing campaign, which he felt would "[turn] people off". A remix of the song produced by RAC was released on March 18, 2014, and another remix from Galimatias appeared on the album Worlds Remixed the following year.

== Reception and aftermath ==
"Sea of Voices"
Several reviewers appreciated the extended atmospheric section slowly building towards the chorus.

Billboard's Zel McCarthy and Elissa Stolman, writing for Vice, noted that "Sea of Voices" represents a significant divergence from Robinson's prior work. Though the song came as a surprise to followers of his work, it was well received by audiences. "Sea of Voices" was released shortly before the 86th Academy Awards, but nonetheless became a trending topic on Twitter during the event, contrary to Robinson's expectations.

Most reviewers praised the song's atmosphere, Stolman writing that Robinson had created the "first ambient EDM track". AllMusic's Andy Kellman noted that the first three minutes are "nothing but softly swelling strings, wind chimes, and Breanne Düren's distantly cooing voice", and Garrett Kamps of Spin felt that Robinson had "really earned that huge build" in the context of Worlds's tracklist. Mason noted a subsequent "intergalactic downbeat release" at the chorus, which AXS's Lucas Villa writes "[submerges] the listener" into the track's "beauty". Billboard's Megan Buerger felt that song has the emotional qualities of a "tear-jerking blockbuster", and a Vice writer commented that the song was evidence Robinson had "evolved greatly as a musician".

Several reviewers found the song reminiscent of the electronic band M83; Vice also identified similarities with the work of Orbital, and Kamps with the post-rock band Sigur Rós. In his review of Worlds, Derek Staples of Consequence of Sound felt that "Sea of Voices" was "a few months too late for inclusion on the Divergent soundtrack."

In April 2021, Robinson released the song "Unfold" in collaboration with TEED as a single preceding his studio album Nurture. Speaking about the composition of the song, Robinson acknowledged they had taken influences from "Sea of Voices", particularly in the sound design. As a result, the song took on a more maximalist tone, which Robinson felt was "epic" and an apt "end-of-album-moment".

== Charts ==
Chart (2014)	Peak position
US Hot Dance/Electronic Songs (Billboard)	40

== Release history ==
Version	Region	Date	Format(s)	Label
Original	Worldwide	March 3, 2014	Digital download; streaming	Astralwerks
RAC Remix	Worldwide	March 18, 2014	Digital download; streaming	Astralwerks
Galimatias Remix (Note: Released on the album Worlds Remixed (2015).)	Worldwide	September 18, 2015	Digital download; streaming	Astralwerks
