= Fred Rosen (businessman) =

American attorney and business executive

- Education: Clark University; Brooklyn Law School (JD)
- Occupations: Attorney, business executive
- Known for: former CEO of Ticketmaster
- Spouse: Nadine Schiff

Fredric D. Rosen is an American attorney and business executive. He was the president and chief executive officer of Ticketmaster from 1982 to 1998.

== Early life ==
Fredric D. Rosen grew up in New Rochelle, New York. He graduated from Clark University in Worcester, Massachusetts, in 1965. He went on to receive a Juris Doctor degree from the Brooklyn Law School in 1969, and passed the New York State Bar that year.

== Career ==
Rosen practiced the law in New York City from 1972 to 1982.

He was an attorney of Ticketmaster before becoming the president and chief executive officer from 1982 to 1998. Rosen was chairman and chief executive officer of Stone Canyon Entertainment from 2005 to 2008. He was the co-chief executive officer of Outbox Enterprises, LLC, a legal entity comprising Outbox Technology, Cirque du Soleil, from 2011 to 2012. Outbox is a white-label system allowing live entertainment venues to sell tickets directly to customers without third-party involvement. The company later partnered with the Anschutz Entertainment Group to create AXS.

Rosen was a principal until 2014. He was on the Los Angeles Sports and Entertainment Commission. In 2018, Rosen became the president and CEO of Red Carpet Entertainment and its wholly owned subsidiary Red Carpet Home Cinema LLC.

== Personal life ==
Rosen is married to Nadine Schiff, an author and film producer. They reside in Bel Air, Los Angeles, California. He also has two children from a prior marriage.

Rosen donated to the defense fund for Mark Ridley-Thomas, a Los Angeles politician who was undergoing trial on corruption charges.

=== Homeowners alliance ===
He is the co-founder of the Bel Air Homeowners Alliance, a NIMBY group active in Los Angeles. The group has contested the construction of giga-mansions such as The One, arguing that they should be considered commercial developments. He has advocated against the construction of the Sepulveda Transit Corridor, an underground subway line to the UCLA campus, including threats to litigate against individual LA Metro staff, noting that staff "deserve no courtesy and are entitled to no respect".
