= The Line (animation studio) =

British animation studio

- The studio's title logo
- Company type: Animation studio
- Industry: 2D animation
- Founded: 2013; 13 years ago
- Founders: Sam Taylor; Bjorn-Erik Aschim; Wesley Louis; James Duveen; Max Taylor; Tim McCourt
- Headquarters: London, England, United Kingdom
- Key people: Sam Taylor; Bjorn-Erik Aschim; Wesley Louis; James Duveen; Max Taylor; Tim McCourt
- Products: Song Machine
- Website: https://www.thelineanimation.com

The Line is a British independent 2D animation studio which was based in London, England and was founded in 2013 by a team of six animators (Sam Taylor, Bjorn-Erik Aschim, Wesley Louis, James Duveen, Max Taylor and Tim McCourt). The studio has produced advertisements for a number of brands and has also produced music videos for bands, including N.A.S.A and Gorillaz.

== Overview ==
The Line's first film was the animated short film Everything I Can See From Here which was nominated for a BAFTA Award for British Short Animation in 2014. The Line is known for its work with the British cartoon band Gorillaz and is also known for producing the band's 2020 web series Song Machine and the music video for the band's 2018 single "Humility". The studio has also produced other music videos for songs, including "Easy" by Porter Robinson and Mat Zo, "Strange Enough" by N.A.S.A. and "Giants" by True Damage (a cartoon band created for the 2009 video game League of Legends). The Line has also produced advertisements for various brands, including Nickelodeon, Virgin Media, Gucci, Doritos, Viceland, Freeview, YT Izzo and others.

== History ==
The Line began in 2013 when its six founders rented a studio in East London to work on their material. The first time that all six founders worked on a project together was the music video for the single "Easy" by Porter Robinson and Mat Zo. After being satisfied with the experience, the six founders of The Line decided to continue working together as a collective. The Line's first animated short film Everything I Can See From Here was nominated for a BAFTA Award for British Short Animation in 2014. The exposure from the short film's award nomination was followed by a series of opportunities and offers for collaborations from various brands.

== Filmography ==
=== Short films ===
- Everything I Can See From Here (2013)

=== Web series ===
- Song Machine (2020)

=== Music videos ===
Year	Song title	Musical artist
2010	"Strange Enough"	N.A.S.A.
2013	"Easy"	Porter Robinson and Mat Zo
2018	"Humility"	Gorillaz and George Benson
2019	"Giants"	True Damage

=== Advertisements ===
- E4 “E4 Man” 2011
- Game of Thrones “Blinkbox” 2014
- Freeview “Set Yourself Free” 2014
- STV1 “Ramadan” 2014
- HSBC “Charged Up” 2015
- YouTube “A-Z of Youtube” 2015
- Virgin Media “9.58 Seconds” 2016
- Doritos “Doritos Collisions” 2018
- Gucci “Gucci SS2018” 2018
- Blizzard Entertainment “Heroes of the Storm - MechaStorm” 2018
- Chucklefish “Wargroove” 2019
- Unilever “Every U Does Good” 2019
- YT Izzo “YT IZZO: FAST・AGILE・SHARP” 2020
- Sanrio “Hello Kitty” 2020
- Riot Games “Worlds 2020 - League of Legends” 2020
- Kenzo “The Great Race” 2020
- TBS “TBS Idents”
- Red Bull “Zenit”
- Nickelodeon “Vines”
- Warframe "ORION: Jade Shadows: Constellations" 2026
