= Sad Machine =

Single by Porter Robinson

from the album Worlds
- Released: May 13, 2014
- Recorded: 2014
- Genre: Synth-pop
- Length: 5:51
- Label: Astralwerks
- Songwriter: Porter Robinson
- Producer: Porter Robinson

Porter Robinson singles chronology
"Sea of Voices" (2014)	"Sad Machine" (2014)	"Lionhearted" (2014)

"Sad Machine" is a song recorded by the American electronic music producer Porter Robinson for his debut studio album, Worlds (2014). For the song, Robinson had the concept of a duet between a robot and a human — these vocals are provided by a Vocaloid voice and Robinson himself, respectively. He wanted it to contain elements of fiction and nostalgia. Critics noted the song as synth-pop and the inspirations from Passion Pit, M83, and Sigur Rós.

"Sad Machine" was released on May 13, 2014, as the second single from Worlds. Critics highlighted the song's atmospheric feeling. It was included in the lists of best electronic dance music (EDM) songs of multiple publications, including being ranked among the best of all time by Vice. It charted on Billboard's Dance/Electronic Songs and received a gold certification in the United States by the Recording Industry Association of America.

== Background and composition ==
"I just thought the notion of a human and robot duet was something that was really beautiful and touching to me. And that vibe really evoked the whole feeling of fantasy and fiction and escapism that I wanted the album to have."

— Robinson in an interview with Cuepoint.

"Sad Machine" was the last song Robinson wrote for his debut studio album, Worlds. He said it was his favorite song from the album and that it could serve as a summary of its events. Robinson described the tone of the song to be "[f]ragile and vulnerable [...] but wistful and nostalgic". The track is 88.5 beats per minute, half of 177, the latter of which Robinson wished to imply with the lead synth in the beginning of the song. He wished for the listener to anticipate a drum and bass beat and become caught off guard when the song revealed its actual tempo.

"Sad Machine"
On "Sad Machine", Robinson duets with Avanna, a Vocaloid voice. Cirisano wrote that the song's "glitchy, techy" elements were representative of Worlds and its connection to video games.

Robinson described the track as a "duet between a lonely robot girl and the human boy". He wished to create something that felt "distantly sad, a little cute, surreal, hopeful, and maybe somehow evocative of fiction?" The track uses the Vocaloid software voice Avanna to provide the lead vocals for the song. The male vocals on the track are provided by Robinson himself, marking the first of Robinson's own tracks that he uses his own vocals on. Larry Fitzmaurice of Pitchfork described Robinson's voice as high-range and found its use of the lead vocal as "quite [effective]". The track has "cheap little general-midi interludes" reminiscent of Nintendo 64 and old computer games, which are nostalgic to Robinson, helping "Sad Machine" to feel "fantastical and fictional" in his view.

Tatiana Cirisano of Billboard said that the track "takes a sugar-sweet, synth-pop direction", while Andy Kellman of AllMusic said that the track "has some naive synth pop charm". Writing for Billboard, Matt Medved said the track kept the atmospheric feeling of the album's lead single, "Sea of Voices". With a mid-tempo instrumental and "starry-eyed melodic structure", Fitzmaurice said that "Sad Machine" was one of some tracks on Worlds that resembled the "high-wire synth-pop fantasias" of Passion Pit, with Consequence of Sound's Derek Staples comparing it to their album Manners (2009). Las Vegas Weekly's Mike Prevatt identified inspirations from M83 and Sigur Rós. Chris DeVille of Stereogum wrote that the song "splits the difference between M83's astral splendor and Passion Pit's hyperactive synth-pop".

== Release and reception ==
Originally, "Flicker" would be the album's second single, after "Sea of Voices". However, he then wrote "Sad Machine" and decided to change his selection three days before it came out, as he "knew [...] [it] needed to be the next [song] that was put out". According to Robinson, this caused "mayhem" at the label because "it is a fucking nightmare to get something like that done". The track was premiered by The Fader on May 12, 2014, and released officially a day later, with Robinson revealing Worlds' release date. A lyric video was released on May 21. A remix by Deon Custom appeared on Worlds Remixed (2015).

Critics highlighted the song's atmospheric feeling. (Note: Attributed to multiple references:) Duncan Cooper of The Fader said that "Sad Machine" "[s]ounds like how it would feel like to discover the sun", while Lucas Villa of AXS said that the track goes to the "dreamier side of electronic music", describing it as "[h]eroic and awe-inspiring". Rupert Howe of Q highlighted the song in his review of Worlds, along with "Divinity" and "Goodbye to a World". Samuel Tolzmann wrote to Spectrum Culture that, while the single was "pleasant", it lacked cohesion.

Billboard's Matt Medved considered "Sad Machine" the third best electronic or dance song of 2014 and "one of the year's most unique releases". In 2015, Spin named it the 40th greatest electronic dance music (EDM) anthem of the first half of the 2010s. Harley Brown described the song as "[o]ne of the most soulful electronic tracks ever", containing "tinkling, cloud-like melodies [that are] beautiful and sad and soaring", as well as being "more unforgettable" when compared to other songs by Robinson. In 2017, Billboard named "Sad Machine" the second best track off Robinson's discography, with Cirisano describing it as "stunning". The same year, Vice named it the seventh best EDM song of all time; Colin Joyce said that the track "shows part of what makes Robinson so great: he can anthropomorphize machines, lending feeling to heaps of metal and silicon". "Sad Machine" charted on Billboard's Dance/Electronic Songs at number 29 and received a gold certification in the United States by the Recording Industry Association of America, with 500,000 certified units.

== Charts ==
Chart performance for "Sad Machine"
Chart (2014)	Peak position
US Hot Dance/Electronic Songs (Billboard)	29

== Certifications ==
Certifications for "Sad Machine"
Region	Certification	Certified units/sales
United States (RIAA)	Gold	500,000^{‡}
^{‡} Sales+streaming figures based on certification alone.

== Release history ==
Release history for "Sad Machine"
Version	Region	Date	Format(s)	Label	Ref.
Original	Various	May 13, 2014	Digital download; streaming	Astralwerks	
Deon Custom Remix	Various	October 15, 2015	Digital download; streaming	Astralwerks	
