= Flicker (song) =

Single by Porter Robinson

from the album Worlds
- Released: July 28, 2014
- Recorded: 2014
- Length: 4:39
- Label: Astralwerks
- Songwriter: Porter Robinson
- Producer: Porter Robinson

Porter Robinson singles chronology
"Lionhearted" (2014)	"Flicker" (2014)	"Shelter" (2016)

"Flicker" is a song recorded by American electronic music producer Porter Robinson. It was released on July 28, 2014 as the fourth single from his debut studio album Worlds (2014). Robinson wrote, produced, and performed the track. Musically, the song contains elements of disco and hip-hop, as well as sampling of soul music. Vocally, the song contains a text-to-speech voice incorrectly translating "never seen" Japanese song titles that have been chopped and screwed in a rap-like style.

An official music video for the single premiered on August 14, 2014, and involves footage of Japan filtered with effects including those of 8-bit video games. The song was well-received from critics, and was a hit on the American Dance/Electronic Songs chart.

== Composition ==
"I liked the way it sounded, I liked the rhythm of it, the cadence and the flow, so I decided to keep it. But yeah, that song is kind of a frankensong. It’s one of my prouder moments on the album because it goes so many places, but flows naturally in between them. It has, I think, a great climax, a very powerful and big moment."

— Robinson in an interview with Cuepoint.

With "Flicker", one of Porter Robinson's favorite songs of his debut studio album Worlds (2014), he wanted to experiment with samples of soul music, which he became a fan of ever since he listened to his favorite album, Daft Punk's second studio record Discovery (2001). The result was a hip-hop-style instrumental that he felt was "incomplete" with only drums and the phased samples.

He didn't initially plan "Flicker" to be a track on Worlds until some time later when he was using a translation website to translate "song titles that would never be seen" incorrectly into Japanese, and then put the Japanese text into a text-to-speech program for it to be converted into a WAV file for him to "cut it into a rap" which he called a "charming little thing". Finally, he composed the lead melody and chord progression. The text-to-speech speaker on the song says "Watashi wa choudo nani ga juuyou ka mitsukeyou toshite iru," translating to "I'm just trying to find what is important to me," which Robinson said was "nice, because it could have come out as something completely random." The track contains samples from the 2012 anime Ano Natsu de Matteru.

"Flicker"
"Flicker" is influenced by disco.

Robinson described "Flicker" as more of a "journey" than a pop song, saying that it goes "to a lot of different places" structure-wise. The song contains influences of disco, opening with a "summer-y disco guitar" before moving into "hands-in-the-air synth blasts" as Elissa Stolman wrote to Vice. Megan Buerger wrote to Billboard that the song begins with a calm disco beat reminiscent of old video games, with a faint bassline building in the background, and, after two minutes, there are "30 intense seconds of thick, swinging bass". The pitch shifting of the samples was influenced by the works of Jay Dilla. The song's composition and arrangement was compared by Spin magazine's Garrett Kamps to the works of Boards of Canada, while other listeners compared the track's use of soul samples to that of "The Glory," a track from Kanye West's third album Graduation (2007).

== Release and promotion ==
"Flicker" premiered on July 28, 2014, by Vogue magazine for streaming as Worlds' fourth and final single. The song was initially planned to be the album's second single after "Sea of Voices," but Robinson replaced it with "Sad Machine" three days before its release. Robinson wanted "Flicker" to be the LP's last single, given that it presented the record's "cuter" aspect. Upon its release, it debuted at number 37 on the Billboard Dance/Electronic Songs chart in the United States on the issue week of August 16, 2014, later re-appearing at its peak of number 34 on the week of August 30.

A remix by Robinson's friend Mat Zo, which he said was "[o]ne of the best remixes I've ever gotten in my life", was first heard at his performance at the Monstercat label showcase, and was released on September 9, 2015 as a single off the official remix album for Worlds. The re-cut was ranked number seven on Billboard's "The 15 Best Dance / Electronic Remixes of 2015," Matt Medved writing that "What Mat Zo's meandering revision of the Worlds fan-favorite lacks in cohesion, it more than makes up in imagination." An official animated music video for "Flicker" premiered on August 14, 2014. Lucas Villa described the video as "like seeing Japan on a train ride," where "scenes of the area fly by with an abounding amount of digital alterations." Footage of Japan in the video is filtered with "stunning visuals" and 8-bit video game effects. The video was well received, with Villa calling it "as awe-inspiring as the track itself."

== Critical reception ==
Stolman praised Robinson on the track for not being "overwhelmed by his influences, which seem to extend farther back into history than most producers in his field", while joking that "it's just a bit of a shame that disco is one of them." In his mixed review of Worlds, Derek Staples of Consequence of Sound praised "Flicker" and "Goodbye to a World" for highlighting "Robinson's more intricate big room capabilities" in an album where "Robinson hides his former bass-fueled self behind the album's sheen." AllMusic journalist Andy Kellman said in his review of the album that "Flicker", along with "Lionhearted" and "Years of War" "have sections muscular and bold enough to move large crowds", while Las Vegas Weekly critic Mike Prevatt described the track's hook as having an "emotional payoff." Tatiana Cirisano of Billboard ranked "Flicker" as the tenth best track on Robinson's discography in 2017, describing it as Worlds's most intricate, while Buerger wrote to the same magazine that the track was the album's most dynamic.

== Charts ==
Chart (2014)	Peak position
US Dance/Electronic Songs (Billboard)	34

== Release history ==
Version	Region	Date	Format(s)	Label
Original	Worldwide	July 28, 2014	Digital download; streaming	Astralwerks
Mat Zo Remix	Worldwide	September 9, 2015	Digital download; streaming	Astralwerks
