= Alina Baraz =

American singer and songwriter

- Born: September 24, 1993 (age 33); Cleveland, Ohio, U.S.
- Genre: R&B
- Occupations: Singer; songwriter
- Instrument: Vocals
- Years active: 2013–present
- Labels: Mom + Pop; Ultra; Alina Baraz, LLC/UnitedMasters
- Website: alinabaraz.com

Alina Baraz (born September 24, 1993) is an American singer. Born and raised in Cleveland, Ohio, she began her professional musical career in 2013 when she released "Roses Dipped in Gold". In 2015, Baraz and electronic producer Galimatias released a collaborative EP together titled Urban Flora through Ultra Music after discovering each other's work online. The EP was met with positive reception and streaming success. Baraz released her first solo EP, The Color of You, in 2018. In April 2020, Baraz released her debut studio album, It Was Divine.

== Early life ==
Alina Baraz was born on September 24, 1993, in Cleveland, Ohio, to Russian-Ukrainian parents. She was the first child in her family born in the United States. Growing up, her parents raised her on classical music, and on her own, she became interested in '90s music and singers such as Adele, Amy Winehouse and Corinne Bailey Rae. She began singing at a young age in her gospel choir. At age 19, she decided to move to Los Angeles, California to pursue singing as a professional career. She developed a passion for songwriting and wrote her first song, titled "Roses Dipped in Gold", released on April 15, 2013, in the "Lounge Masters Vibes" collection series.

== Career ==
=== 2013–2016: Urban Flora ===
After moving to Los Angeles, Baraz discovered Danish electronic producer Galimatias' music online. She wrote lyrics for one of his instrumentals and released it on SoundCloud as a song titled "Drift" in 2013. Galimatias heard the track and decided to create more music with her. The two created an EP titled Urban Flora by sending each other music through Facebook and did not meet in person until February 2015, when the project was already finished. Alongside "Drift", the songs "Pretty Thoughts", "Make You Feel" and "Fantasy" were released individually preceding Urban Flora. The EP was originally released on SoundCloud but on May 19, 2015, it received a commercial digital release through Ultra Music. Upon release, Urban Flora was met with positive critical reception, and it peaked at number 111 on the US Billboard 200 and number 2 on the US Billboard Top Dance/Electronic Albums Chart. On September 9, 2015, a remix EP for Urban Flora was released, and later that month Baraz and Galimatias embarked on a brief co-headlining North American concert tour in support of the EP. In August 2016, Baraz signed a record deal with independent label Mom + Pop Music and released a vinyl edition of Urban Flora.

=== 2016–2020: The Color of You and It Was Divine ===
In the spring and summer of 2016, Baraz made her first solo live appearances by performing at North American music festivals such as Lightning in a Bottle, Sasquatch! Music Festival, Electric Forest Festival and Lollapalooza. Also in the summer of 2016, Baraz shared that she was working on her debut solo studio album. Baraz's first solo single, "Electric," featuring R&B singer Khalid, was released on January 20, 2017 through Mom + Pop Music, the single later appeared on her second EP, The Color of You, in 2018. Following the release of the single, Baraz announced her first solo concert tour, entitled the 'Let's Get Lost Tour'. The tour took place from March to April 2017 and visited various cities across the United States and Canada.

In September and October 2017, Baraz supported British rock band Coldplay for the final 8 North American shows on their A Head Full of Dreams Tour. On September 29, 2017, Baraz released two singles, titled "Lavender and Velvet" and "Buzzin," in anticipation of her upcoming debut studio album. "Buzzin" peaked at number 10 on the US Billboard Dance/Electronic Digital Songs Chart and the music video for the song, Baraz's first music video, was released exclusively through Apple Music on December 22, 2017. It was announced that Baraz will be part of the Coachella 2018 lineup.

On April 6, 2018, Baraz released her first solo EP, The Color of You, and released a music video for the track "I Don't Even Know Why Though".

In September 2019 Baraz released the single "To Me". In January 2020, Baraz released the standalone single "Trust", which was followed by the singles "Morocco" and "More Than Enough" in February and March respectively.

In March 2020, Baraz announced the release of her debut studio album, It Was Divine, which was released on April 24, 2020. The album was supported by the singles "To Me", "Morocco" featuring 6lack, "More Than Enough" and "Off The Grid" featuring Khalid. It Was Divine features guest appearances from Nas and Smino and charted at #43 on the Billboard 200.

=== 2021–present: Independent music and touring ===
On July 23, 2021, Alina Baraz released the single "Alone With You". The song would mark her first release as an independent artist, following her departure from her previous record label, Mom+Pop. Alongside the song's release, Baraz announced a tour of the same name, set to start in late 2021. On September 24, Baraz released the EP Sunbeam. The EP serves as part one of a two-part EP series. The second EP, Moongate, was released on October 29, 2021. Alina's single "Don't Buy Me Roses" was released in September 2023. On May 1st 2026, she released her newest single “Take Care Of You”.

== Tours ==
Headlining

- Urban Flora Tour (with Galimatias) (2015)
- Let's Get Lost Tour (2017)
- Alina Baraz: The Tour (2018)
- Alone With You Tour (2021)
- Keep Me In Love Experience (2023)

Supporting

- Coldplay – A Head Full of Dreams Tour (2017)

== Discography ==
=== Albums ===
List of albums with selected details and chart peaks
Title	Details	Peak positions		
Title	Details	US	US R&B	US Indie
It Was Divine	Released: April 24, 2020; Label: Mom + Pop; Formats: CD, LP, digital download, streaming	43	6	5

=== Extended plays ===
List of extended plays with selected details and chart peaks
Title	Details	Peak positions		
Title	Details	US	US Elec.	US Heat.
Urban Flora (with Galimatias)	Released: May 19, 2015; Label: Ultra; Formats: LP, digital download	111	2	1
The Color of You	Released: April 6, 2018; Label: Mom + Pop; Formats: CD, LP, digital download	59	—	—
It Was Divine (Remixes)	Released: October 7, 2020; Label: Mom + Pop; Formats: digital download, streaming	—	—	—
Sunbeam	Released: September 24, 2021; Label: Alina Baraz LLC; Formats: digital download, streaming	—	—	—
Moongate	Released: October 29, 2021; Label: Alina Baraz LLC; Formats: digital download, streaming	—	—	—

=== Singles ===
List of singles as lead artist, with selected chart peaks and certifications
Title	Year	Peaks		Certifications	Album
Title	Year	US Elec. Dig.	US R&B	Certifications	Album
"Drift" (with Galimatias)	2015	—	—		Urban Flora
"Make You Feel" (with Galimatias)	2015	—	—	RIAA: Gold	Urban Flora
"Fantasy" (with Galimatias)	2015	36	—	RIAA: Gold; MC: Gold	Urban Flora
"Electric" (featuring Khalid)	2017	—	—		The Color of You
"Gone" (with Phlake)	2017	—	—		Weird Invitations
"Lavender and Velvet"	2017	—	—		Non-album singles
"Buzzin"	2017	10	—		Non-album singles
"Feels Right"	2018	—	—		Non-album singles
"To Me"	2019	—	—		It Was Divine
"Trust"	2020	—	—		Non-album single
"Morocco" (featuring 6LACK)	2020	—	—		It Was Divine
"More Than Enough"	2020	—	—		It Was Divine
"Off The Grid" (featuring Khalid)	2020	—	23		It Was Divine
"Alone With You"	2021	—	—		Sunbeam
"Breathless"	2023	—	—		Non-album singles
"Keep Me In Love"	2023	—	—		Non-album singles
"Don't Buy Me Roses"	2023	—	—		Non-album singles

=== Guest appearances ===
List of non-single guest appearances
Title	Year	Other artist(s)	Album
"Down for You"	2015	Ta-ku	Songs to Make Up To

=== Promotional singles ===
List of promotional singles, with selected details
Title	Year	Album
"I Don't Even Know Why Though"	2018	The Color Of You
"Coming To My Senses"	2018	The Color Of You
"Endlessly"	2020	It Was Divine
