= Outbox (company) =

Ticket sales company

Outbox Technology
- Type: Privately held company
- Industry: Software
- Founded: 2005
- Founder: Jean-Francoys Brousseau
- Headquarters: Montreal, Canada
- Area served: Worldwide
- Key people: Jean-Francoys Brousseau and Fred D. Rosen
- Products: Waiting Room
- Services: Ticketing systems for events
- Website: www.outbox.com

Outbox is a Canadian company providing an electronic ticketing system. The company was founded in 2005 and based in Montreal. It would go on to create Outbox AXS together with Anschutz Entertainment Group (AEG) as a rival to Ticketmaster.

Outbox sold its share of the business to AEG which became AXS and that was later merged with Veritix. Outbox itself continued to sell ticketing systems to third party event providers.

It offered a white label system to sell tickets directly to customers, allowing live entertainment venues to control their inventory, pricing, and consumer data without third party involvement. Cirque du Soleil, a client, also became a shareholder.

== History ==
Outbox Enterprises was born from Outbox Technology, founded in 2005 by Jean-Francoys Brousseau.

In 2011, Outbox and Anschutz Entertainment Group (AEG) created AXS, a competitor to Ticketmaster.

The former Ticketmaster CEO Frederic D. Rosen became the CEO of Outbox Enterprises. After a year, Fred Rosen had to step down, which suggests a sign of internal troubles at Outbox.

In 2015, it changed its name to Outbox AXS, indicating a clash of visions between Outbox and AEG. In 2019, Outbox sold its stake in AXS to AEG.

In 2015, Outbox AXS also merged with the paperless ticketing system Veritix.

In 2020, Cirque du Soleil, a major shareholder of Outbox, went bankrupt as a direct result of having to shut down for the COVID-19 pandemic, but emerged from bankruptcy the following year.
