= Giraffage =

American music record producer (born 1992)

- Born: Charlie Yin; November 25, 1992 (age 33)
- Origin: San Francisco, California, U.S.
- Genres: Electronica, R&B, ambient, hypnagogic pop
- Occupations: Producer, performer, musician
- Years active: 2011–present
- Label: Counter Records (current)
- Website: giraffage.com

Charlie Yin, professionally known as Giraffage, is an American electronic music record producer. Of Taiwanese descent, Yin grew up in San Jose, California, and graduated from the University of California, Berkeley, with a degree in Political Economics. He subsequently pursued his musical career, regularly performing as Giraffage at San Francisco Bay Area venues and around the world, independently and with other artists. Yin has collaborated with other electronic music producers, including Porter Robinson.

Giraffage has produced numerous remixes of pop and R&B tracks and several EPs, including No Reason, released on November 18, 2014. He has produced three full-length studio albums: Comfort in 2011; Needs in 2013; and Too Real, released on October 20, 2017. In 2022, he debuted his collaborative project Bodysync with Canadian DJ Ryan Hemsworth.

== Career ==
Yin started releasing music in 2011 with his debut EP Pretty Things. Later that same year, he followed it up with his first full-length album, Comfort. His first few releases were sample-heavy, taking inspiration in late-2000s chillwave artists like Toro y Moi and Washed Out.

In 2012, he embarked on a 30-date European tour with Orlando producer XXYYXX after the release of their collaborative EP, Even Though. Shortly afterwards, Giraffage signed to Alpha Pup Records in early 2013 and released his second album Needs.

Giraffage performed as the main support during Porter Robinson's "Worlds" tour of North America in 2013. In November of the same year he released the No Reason EP through Fool's Gold Records. No Reason received acclaim from blogs like Pitchfork, XLR8R, and The FADER, who described the project as "bedroom dream-pop" with "the lushest of synthesizers."

In 2017, Giraffage signed to Counter Records (an imprint of Ninja Tune) for the release of his third EP, No Reason. The album launch began with the single "Slowly", which featured Matosic and was released worldwide on October 20, 2017. On his full-length album Too Real, Yin also collaborated with indie artists such as Japanese Breakfast.

Yin has played venues and festivals worldwide, including Boiler Room, Coachella, Outside Lands, EDC, HARD Summer, Brooklyn Electronic Music Festival, and Decibel Festival, and toured North America in support of his Too Real album.

== Previous projects ==
Prior to Giraffage, Yin produced chiptune music under the moniker "Robot Science" in 2009 with the debut EP Doodads. He followed this up with Square in 2010 and Good Luck in 2011.

== Discography ==
=== LPs ===
- Comfort (2011)
- Needs (2013)
- Too Real (2017)

=== EPs ===
- Pretty Things (2011)
- No Reason (2014)

=== Singles ===
- "Even Though" (with XXYYXX) (2012)
- "Move Me" (with Jhameel and DWNTWN) (2013)
- "Impression of You" (with Viceroy and Patrick Baker) (2015)
- "Bring Me Your Love" (2016)
- "Slowly" (2017)
- "Workout" (2020)
- "Basketball" (2020)

=== Remixes ===
Year	Artist	Track
2011	Slow Magic	"Sorry Safari"
2011	Slow Magic	"Feel Flows"
2012	Gracie	"Tryck R Treat"
2012	Tinashe	"The Last Night On Earth"
2012	Labyrinth Ear	"Humble Bones"
2013	Perfume	"Computer City"
2013	Janet Jackson	"Someone To Call My Lover"
2013	Owl Eyes	"Closure"
2013	Stardust	"Music Sounds Better With You"
2013	Alice DeeJay	"Better Off Alone"
2013	MOVEMENT	"Us"
2014	The-Dream	Love Hate
2014	Mapei	"Don't Wait"
2014	R. Kelly	"Ignition (Remix)"*
2014	Porter Robinson	"Lionhearted"
2015	Odesza	"All We Need" (feat. Shy Girls)
2015	Tinashe	"All Hands on Deck"
2020	darkDARK	"No Symmetry"

(*The R. Kelly remix was later reworked into an original track entitled "Be With You" and included on the No Reason EP.)
