= Bert Fields =

American lawyer (1929–2022)

- Born: Bertram Harris Fields; March 31, 1929; Los Angeles, California, U.S.
- Died: August 7, 2022 (aged 93); Malibu, California, U.S.
- Education: University of California, Los Angeles (BA); Harvard Law School (LLB)
- Occupations: Entertainment lawyer; author
- Spouses: Amy Markson (divorced) Lydia Minevitch (m. 1960; died 1986) Barbara Guggenheim (m. 1991)
- Children: 1

Bertram Harris Fields (March 31, 1929 – August 7, 2022) was an American lawyer noted for his work in the field of entertainment law. He represented many of the leading film studios, as well as numerous celebrities, and lectured at both Stanford and Harvard Law Schools. Fields was also a musician and an author of both fiction and non-fiction books.

== Early life and legal career ==
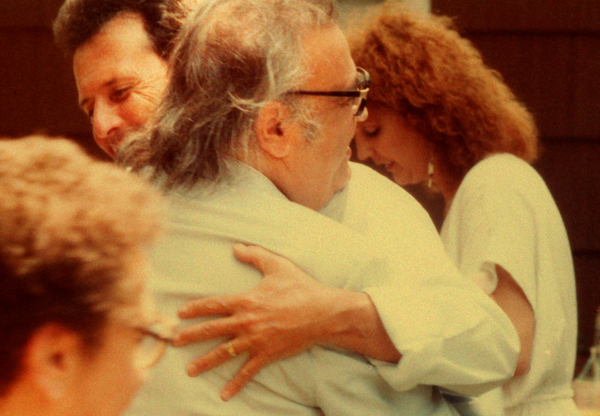
Bert Fields and Mario Puzo

Bertram Harris Fields was born on March 31, 1929, in Los Angeles, California, the only child of Mildred Arlyn Rubin, a former ballet dancer, and F. Maxwell Fields, an eye surgeon. His family was Jewish.

He received his B.A. from the University of California, Los Angeles, in 1949, and his LL.B. from Harvard Law School (magna cum laude) in 1952. He was a member of the California and New York Bars. Fields' notable clients included Michael Jackson, The Beatles, Warren Beatty, James Cameron, Mike Nichols, Joel Silver, Tom Cruise, Dustin Hoffman, Mario Puzo, and John Travolta.

Fields represented George Lucas in contract negotiations with The Walt Disney Company regarding Disney theme parks. He also represented Paramount Pictures in its appeal of the Buchwald v. Paramount case over Coming to America, and in other civil litigation. He represented Jeffrey Katzenberg in a landmark action against Disney, and also obtained a multimillion-dollar judgement for George Harrison against his former business manager. Representing DreamWorks SKG and Steven Spielberg, he defeated an application for an injunction against exhibition of Amistad.

Fields also represented Michael Jackson during contract talks with Sony Music, in the early 1990s and during the 1993 child molestation allegations made against Jackson.

Fields defended the Church of Scientology after many of its celebrity members, including Tom Cruise, John Travolta, and Chick Corea, were boycotted in Germany, where the religion is not legally recognized. He wrote an open letter to Chancellor Helmut Kohl in the International Herald Tribune comparing the boycotts to Nazi book burnings.

Fields represented Bob and Harvey Weinstein through years of skirmishes between Miramax and its corporate owner, Disney, rarely making public statements until he arranged the brothers' departure, in 2005, without litigation.

In January 2008, Fields, representing Tom Cruise, stated that an unauthorized biography (by British author Andrew Morton) was full of "tired old lies" or "sick stuff."

In June 2008, Drew Pinsky, in an interview for Playboy, mentioned his belief that for Tom Cruise to be "drawn into a cultish kind of environment like Scientology," he was likely to have emotional problems. He said "To me, that's a function of a very deep emptiness and suggests serious neglect in childhood — maybe some abuse, but mostly neglect." Fields, representing Cruise, responded by calling Pinsky an "unqualified television performer" and likened him to Nazi Joseph Goebbels, saying, "He seems to be spewing the absurdity that all Scientologists are mentally ill. The last time we heard garbage like this was from Joseph Goebbels."

Pinsky, a licensed physician of Jewish ancestry, responded through his representative, "Dr. Drew meant no harm to Mr. Cruise and apologizes if his comments were hurtful." The statement continued, "Although Mr. Fields's intent is clearly to slander and discredit Dr. Drew, under no circumstances is Dr. Drew making a blanket diagnosis about Scientology nor Mr. Cruise whom he does not know. Dr. Drew was simply using Mr. Cruise as an example of someone who is recognizable to help the public understand. Again, Dr. Drew meant him no harm."

On March 13, 2012, Fields, attorney for the estate of Mario Puzo, filed a counterclaim against Paramount Pictures, who sued the estate to stop the author's son, Anthony Puzo, from publishing a new sequel to his father's classic Mafia saga, "The Godfather." Fields was quoted as saying, "Mario Puzo brought vast wealth to Paramount at a time when they desperately needed it. Now that he's gone, Paramount's trying to deprive his children of the rights he specifically reserved. I promised Mario I'd protect his kids from this kind of reprehensible conduct. Paramount wanted a war, and they're going to get one."

In April 2014, Harvard Law School announced that Fields made a gift of $5 million to endow the Bertram Fields Professorship of Law.

Fields continued to represent Bob Weinstein, who was accused of sexual harassment on October 17, 2017, by The Mist film producer Amanda Segel, who worked for Weinstein's Dimension Films. Fields denied the accusations, stating that "It is absolutely not true" and "What she is claiming is bogus" and that "There was nothing that came anywhere near sexual harassment". He further stated that "That's not Bob Weinstein. It's Harvey Weinstein, but it sure as hell isn't Bob Weinstein. I've known him for many years. It's all because of what Harvey's done"." Fields and other attorneys from Greenberg Glusker represented The Weinstein Company from 2005 to December 2017 when it dropped them as a client over unpaid bills.

=== Summing Up: A Professional Memoir ===
Cover of Summing Up: A Professional Memoir by Bertram Fields

In 2021, Fields published Summing Up: A Professional Memoir (ISBN 978-09998527-5-0), recounting his long career as an attorney. His insider's look into the world of the famous is sometimes artfully revealing. For example, Fields was already one of Michael Jackson's lawyers when the singer was accused of sexually abusing a child; he resigned due to what he saw as Elizabeth Taylor's interference. (In the book he says that he remains convinced that Jackson was innocent of the charges, however.) Other tales are much lighter in tone; for instance, Gore Vidal turned to Fields when a movie studio refused to credit his work on the screenplay for the 1987 film The Sicilian. Fields won his case, but then Vidal, after seeing the movie, exclaimed, "Keep my name off that piece of s***!"

=== Novels and historical writing ===
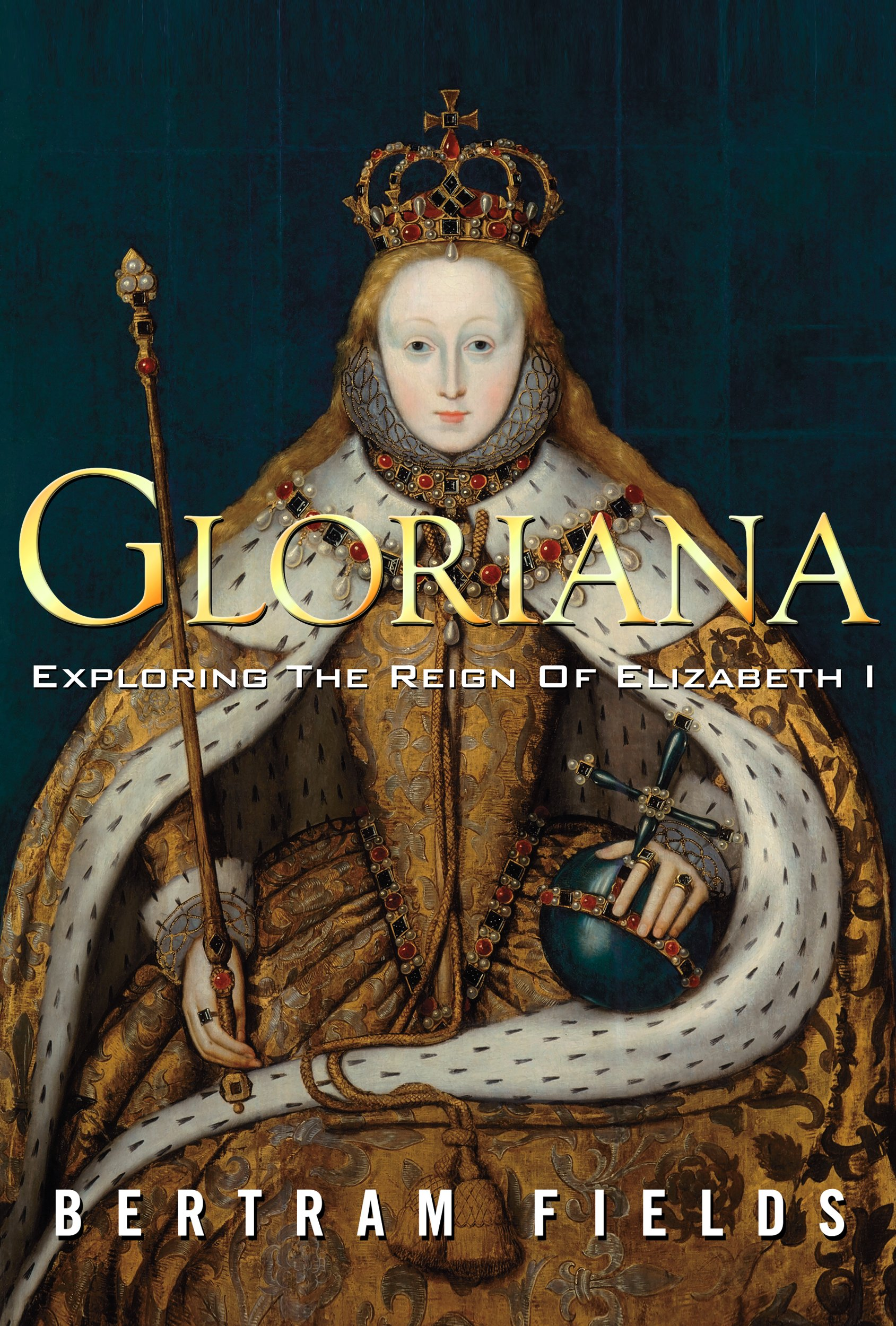
Cover of Gloriana: Exploring the Reign of Elizabeth I by Fields

Cover of Shylock: His Own Story by Fields

Cover of Destiny: A Novel Of Napoleon & Josephine by Bertram Fields

In 2018, Fields published Gloriana: Exploring The Reign Of Elizabeth I. (ISBN 978-0-9905602-9-6) Elizabeth I, aka the Virgin Queen, was a colorful figure who still manages to stimulate the popular imagination more than 400 years after her death. Fields' wide-ranging biography spans the entire Tudor dynasty, with Elizabeth's rise to power, her completion of England's break from the Roman Catholic Church, the war with Spain, and her constantly evolving entourage of advisers, favorites, and paramours. Fields delves into the curios of Elizabeth's life. Was she truly a virgin? Did she sanction the murder of the wife of nobleman Robert Dudley? What were her true thoughts on Roman Catholicism?

Fields introduces readers to aspects of the queen that they may not have heard before. He finds plenty of intrigues to challenge conventional notions of the queen. Full-color portraits from the National Portrait Gallery in London and a timeline of the queen's life round out this volume. Its 450-plus pages belie what a quick read it actually is, showing how good of a resource it is for information on the Good Queen Bess.

In September 2015, Fields published Shylock: His Own Story (ISBN 978-0-9905602-4-1). In "The Merchant Of Venice" Shakespeare gives us only a brief and limited view of Shylock, an enigmatic character who varies with each actor's interpretation. Now, we're given Shylock's full story, his dangerous background, his life, loves and challenges as an educated Jew in 16th century Venice, the motivation for demanding his seemingly bizarre 'bond,' as well as what occurred after his fateful confrontation with Portia and the Doge. The novel was published by Marmont Lane. It is dedicated to Fields' friend, the actor Dustin Hoffman.

In 2015, Fields published Destiny: A Novel Of Napoleon & Josephine. (ISBN 978-0-9905602-0-3) This historical novel tells the story of the Emperor and his beautiful Creole lover. The novel was published by Marmont Lane.

In 2011, Fields was awarded the Crystal Quill Award by the Shakespeare Center Of Los Angeles for his work on William Shakespeare. In 2005, he published the non-fiction book Players: The Mysterious Identity of William Shakespeare, which deals with the authorship of the plays and sonnets of William Shakespeare.

Having read English history for years as a hobby, and not satisfied with the books written about King Richard III, Fields spent four years researching and two years writing the non-fiction book Royal Blood: Richard III and the Mystery of the Princes (ISBN 0-06-039269-X), which was published in 1998.

Although he started with a "gut feeling" that Richard was innocent of murdering his nephews, the Princes in the Tower; Fields claimed to have investigated the facts as he would have for a client he was representing, and he structured the book like a lawyer's brief, identifying the evidence and then drew the logical implications from the facts. In the same way as in a brief, he discussed the weaknesses in earlier authors' treatments of the same subject, being particularly critical of Alison Weir and her book The Princes in the Tower.

The conclusion Fields reached is that the probability that the princes were, in fact, murdered is about 50% to 70%, and if they were, the probability that Richard did it is in the same range, so the logical probability that Richard is guilty is 25% to 49%, which is less than 50-50. Fields says DNA analyses of the bones dug up in the Tower of London in 1674 would change the odds on whether the princes were murdered but might not affect the odds on who did it, if anyone did, so this mystery may never be solved.

Fields penned two novels, published under the pseudonym "D. Kincaid": The Sunset Bomber (1986, published by Corgi Books in London) which was also published under the name Final Verdict (1988), and The Lawyer's Tale (1993).

=== Open letter to the German chancellor ===
In 1997, Fields conceived an open letter to then-German Chancellor Helmut Kohl, published as a newspaper advertisement in the International Herald Tribune, which drew parallels between the "organized oppression" of Scientologists in Germany and Nazi policies espoused by Germany in the 1930s. The letter was signed by 34 prominent figures in the U.S. entertainment industry, including the top executives of MGM, Warner Bros., Paramount, Universal, and Sony Pictures Entertainment as well as actors Dustin Hoffman and Goldie Hawn, director Oliver Stone, writers Mario Puzo and Gore Vidal, and talk-show host Larry King.

=== As a teacher ===
Fields taught at Stanford Law School and lectured annually at Harvard Law School.

=== Musician ===
A serious music enthusiast, Fields performed with his good friend and client George Harrison. He performed and recorded professionally as a singer and vibraphonist with Les Deux Love Orchestra, led by Bobby Woods.

Celebrating his 92nd birthday, he released his first single, a cover of the Gene Autry classic, "Back In The Saddle."

=== Actor ===
In 1967, Fields portrayed prosecutor "Hal Davies" on an episode of Dragnet. Fields was the real-life lawyer for the show's creator and lead actor, Jack Webb.

== Personal life ==
Fields was noted as having "cultivated a dapper and urbane image, based in part on his fondness for English tailoring and English history", according to the Los Angeles Times.

He married three times. After graduating from law school, Fields married his college sweetheart, Amy Markson, with whom he had one son, James Elder Fields (born 1955). In 1960, he married fashion model Lydia Minevitch (daughter of musician Borrah Minevitch) whose divorce he had handled two years prior. She died of lung cancer in 1986, after 27 years of marriage. He met his third wife, art expert Barbara Guggenheim, after she hired him to defend her when, in 1989, she was sued by Sylvester Stallone; they married in 1991.

Fields was survived by his son, James, and two grandchildren, Michael Lane Fields, and Annabelle Fields.

== Death ==
Fields died at his home in Malibu, California, from complications of Long COVID on August 7, 2022, at age 93.

He was buried at a private service at Pierce Brothers Westwood Village Memorial Park and Mortuary in Los Angeles.

== Memorial ==
On October 2, 2022, a memorial was held for Bert Fields at The Eli and Edythe Broad Stage at the Santa Monica College Performing Arts Center. Speakers included Tom Cruise, Rich Eisen, Jeffrey Katzenberg, Susan Estrich, Dustin Hoffman and his daughter Ali Hoffman, Michael Ovitz, Elaine May, members of his family, and his wife, Barbara Guggenheim.

== See also ==
- The American Reporter – "The Pooh Papers" is an archive of 28 articles in the online daily newspaper written by Joe Shea about the celebrated Stephen Slesinger Inc. v. Walt Disney Studios case, in which Fields won a preliminary $200 million judgment but was forced to disqualify himself before the matter was heard at trial. The case was ruled in Disney's favor 18 years after it was filed in Los Angeles Superior Court, with aspects of it having gone to the U.S. Supreme Court. Fields' role in some of the key hearings is explored at length. According to the plaintiffs, Fields' fee (divided among many attorneys) reached $1 million a month before his recusal.
