= Nadine Schiff =

American producer

- Born: Toronto, Ontario, Canada
- Occupations: Film producer, screenwriter, author
- Spouse: Fred Rosen

Nadine Schiff is a Canadian film producer, screenwriter, author and philanthropist from Los Angeles, California.

== Early life ==
Nadine Schiff was born in Toronto, Ontario. She received a Master's degree in Clinical Psychology.

== Career ==
She served as Vice President of Stonebridge Entertainment, a subsidiary of Sony. She also served as Vice President of production at WeddingChannel.com.

She was the co-screenwriter of Made in America in 1993 alongside Marcia Brandwynne and Holly Goldberg Sloan, also serving as executive producer. She was then associate producer of Red Corner in 1997, producer of the TV movie The Wedding Dress in 2001, and executive producer of Breakfast with Scot in 2007.

She was the editor-at-large for Live! Magazine. Additionally, she has co-written three books: Career Makeovers for the Working Woman, The Secret Language of Girlfriends, and The Ultimate Organizer.

== Philanthropy ==
She serves on the Boards of Trustees of United Friends of the Children and the Sundance Institute. When Maria Shriver was the First Lady of California, Schiff established the Minerva Awards with her, which now takes place at the annual Women's Conference. She also established The Ultimate Organizer with Barbara Guggenheim. She was honored with the Junior League of Los Angeles 2018 Community Service award.

== Personal life ==
She is married to Fred Rosen, a business executive. They reside in Bel Air.
