= Urban Flora =

EP by Alina Baraz and Galimatias
- Released: May 19, 2015
- Recorded: 2013–2015
- Genre: Electronic; downtempo; alternative R&B
- Length: 30:47
- Label: Ultra; Mom + Pop
- Producer: Galimatias

Alina Baraz chronology
Urban Flora (2015)	The Color of You (2018)

Galimatias chronology
Sunlight Reigns Supreme (2013)	Urban Flora (2015)	Renaissance Boy (2020)

Singles from Urban Flora
- 1. "Drift" Released: August 9, 2013; 2. "Fantasy" Released: October 12, 2014; 3. "Make You Feel" Released: January 30, 2015

Urban Flora is the debut and collaborative extended play by the American singer Alina Baraz and Danish Musician Galimatias. It was released on May 19, 2015, by Ultra Records, with a vinyl release by Mom + Pop in 2016.

== Background ==
Urban Flora began in 2013 when Baraz and Galimatias connected through SoundCloud. At the time, Baraz was creating and sharing her own tracks by recording vocals over beats she found online and uploading them to the platform. Galimatias discovered one of her songs, and the two began collaborating remotely, exchanging music and ideas through Facebook without ever meeting in person or video chatting.

The title Urban Flora originated from one of their tracks, which Galimatias had temporarily renamed before sending it to Baraz. The name resonated with her and became the title of the EP. Baraz explained that the name symbolizes their partnership, with "Urban" representing Galimatias' production style and "Flora" reflecting her conceptual contributions.

== Music and lyrics ==
Urban Flora combines downtempo electronic production with R&B influences. Alina Baraz's vocals have been described as delicate and emotive, while Galimatias' production is characterized by textured and detailed soundscapes. Paul Lester of The Guardian noted that the extended play balances a dreamlike quality with themes of desire and infatuation, moving beyond surface-level sentiments to explore possession and obsession.

The opening track, "Show Me", introduces the extended play with Alina Baraz's sensual vocals and Galimatias' lush production, setting a tone of intimacy and allure. "Drift" follows with aquatic imagery and layered soundscapes, with its lyrics describing a wave-like pull and gradual surrender. "Can I" centers on themes of mental boundaries, with minimalist production and a dreamy atmosphere highlighted by Baraz's ethereal delivery. "Fantasy", described by Lester as reminiscent of a slowed-down Mariah Carey track, explores escapism and emotional liberation, with Baraz cooing about a place free of time and space.

"Make You Feel" blends Baraz's delicate vocals with stripped-down production, evoking comparisons to Sade's somber works. "Maybe" addresses the duality of deceit and devotion, with Lester noting Baraz's playful vocal lilt and Edwin Ortiz of Complex pointing out the track's forbidden love narrative. With its piano melody, "Pretty Thoughts" combines introspection and ambient tones, drawing parallels to influences like Sade and Satie. The closing track, "Unfold", inspired by a time-lapse video of a blooming flower, encapsulates themes of emotional growth and transformation with Baraz's airy delivery and Galimatias' subtle instrumental backdrop.

== Singles ==
Before being featured on Urban Flora, every single from the album was first made available on Alina Baraz's SoundCloud, where it gained millions of plays. The album's first single, "Drift", was released on August 9, 2013. The album's second single, "Fantasy" was released on October 12, 2014. The song became her first hit, peaking number 36 on the US Dance/Electronic Digital Songs. The album's third single, "Make You Feel", was released on January 30, 2015. Both "Fantasy" and "Make You Feel" were later certified gold by RIAA.

== Critical reception ==
Professional ratings
Review scores
Source	Rating
AllMusic	3.5/5 stars

Urban Flora received generally positive reviews from music critics. Andy Kellman of AllMusic called the album "consistently relaxed and slightly trippy, nearly torpid, filled with lapping sounds carefully plotted for solitary and one-on-one bedroom settings." Complex's Edwin Ortiz praised the EP, saying, "Alina's sensual vocals and Galimatias' equally ravishing backdrops are a perfect marriage on Urban Flora, which effectively sounds and feels like a dedication to the one in your life."

== Track listing ==
Credits adapted from Tidal.

All tracks are written by Alina Baraz and produced by Galimatias.

Urban Flora track listing
No.	Title	Length
1.	"Show Me"	4:13
2.	"Drift"	3:44
3.	"Can I"	3:50
4.	"Fantasy"	3:39
5.	"Make You Feel"	3:41
6.	"Maybe"	3:36
7.	"Pretty Thoughts"	3:32
8.	"Unfold"	4:32
Total length:		30:47

== Personnel ==
- Alina Baraz – vocals
- Galimatias – producer
- Gabriel Levesque – artwork, design

== Charts ==
Weekly chart performance for Urban Flora
Chart (2015)	Peak position
US Billboard 200	111
US Dance/Electronic Albums (Billboard)	2
US Heatseekers Albums (Billboard)	1

== Release history ==
Release dates and formats for Urban Flora
Region	Date	Label(s)	Format(s)	Ref.
United States	May 19, 2015	Ultra Records	Digital download	
United States	2016	Mom + Pop	LP	
