= Barbara Guggenheim =

American art historian

- Born: Woodbury, New Jersey, US
- Education: Columbia University (PhD)
- Occupation: Art dealer
- Spouse(s): Bert Fields (m. 1991; died 2022) Alan Patricof (m. 2023)

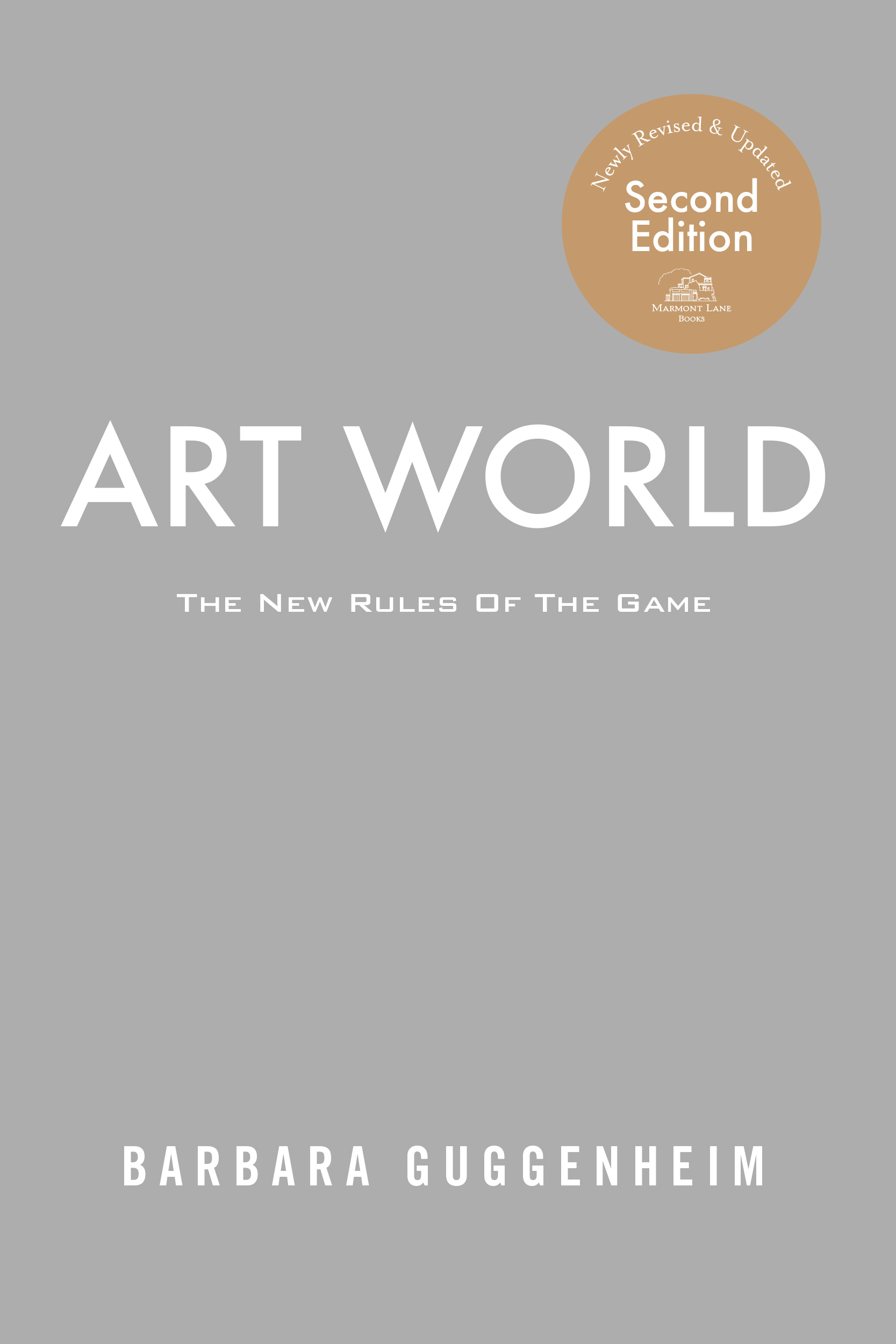
The cover of "Art World" by Barbara Guggenheim

The cover of "Barbara Guggenheim's Only In L.A. (The Insider's Guide to Los Angeles)"

The cover of "little-known facts about well-known people" by Barbara Guggenheim

Barbara Guggenheim is the founder of the art consultancy firm Barbara Guggenheim Associates, Inc. The company, with offices in New York and Los Angeles, has been in business for more than 40 years. Barbara has built collections for corporations including Coca-Cola and Sony, and numerous individuals, including celebrities Tom Cruise and Steven Spielberg. She holds a doctorate in Art History from Columbia University, has taught at the college level, lectured at the Whitney Museum, and has worked at the auction houses Sotheby's and Christie's.

== Biography ==
Guggenheim was raised in Woodbury, New Jersey, the daughter of a dress-shop owner. She graduated with a Ph.D. in art history from Columbia University. She is the author of "Art World," a non-fiction study of the business of collecting art. She is also the author of "Little-Known Facts About Well-Known People," illustrated by Pamela Sztybel, "Decorating on Ebay: Fast and Stylish on a Budget," and "The Ultimate Organizer," co-written with Nadine Schiff. She currently lectures widely on all aspects of art and collecting as well as investing in art. Guggenheim has also contributed to W Magazine, Elle, and Harper's Bazaar. She is also a contributor to The Huffington Post and The Daily Beast.

She was married in 1991 to entertainment attorney Bert Fields. They resided in New York and Los Angeles up until his death from Long COVID in 2022.

On December 10, 2023, she married investor Alan Patricof in New York City.
