= Alma Zohar =

Israeli musician and singer (born 1977)

Alma Zohar עלמה זהר
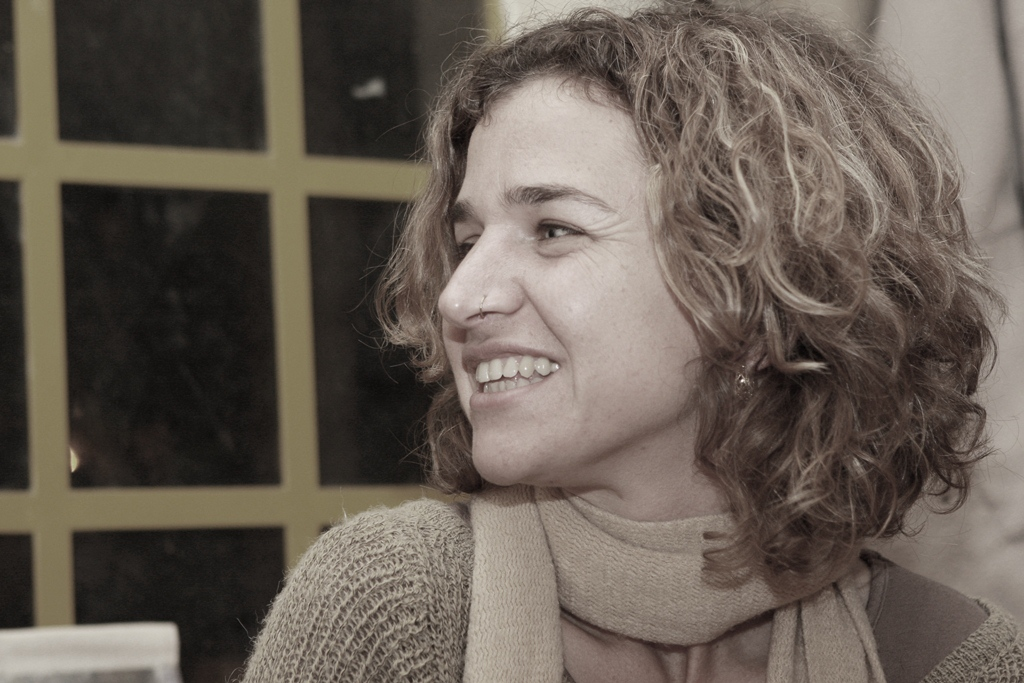

Background information
- Birth name: Alma Zohar
- Born: June 6, 1977 (age 48)
- Origin: Jerusalem, Israel
- Genres: Pop, folk music
- Years active: 2007–present
- Labels: Lev group media

Alma Zohar (Hebrew: עלמה זהר; born June 6, 1977) is an Israeli musician and singer. At age 25, after divorcing her husband, Zohar decided to seriously pursue her childhood dreams and become a singer. She initially worked with a reggae band which recorded in English, but abandoned the project. She experienced success soon afterwards with the release of two songs, "With Your Back" ("Im Hagav") and "Ego Trip". Both songs, which Zohar wrote herself, became hits in Israel in the Spring and Summer of 2008.

Alma Zohar is the half-sister of electronic musician Matan Zohar (a.k.a. Mat Zo).

== Musical career ==
Her debut album, Speak (Dabri), released in July 2008 combined various musical genres, including world music, jazz, reggae, folk and rock. It has achieved gold status in Israel. The album, which was produced by Assaf Ayalon, included the singles, "Indian Love Song (Miguel)" ("Shir Ahava Indiani") and "Know" ("Da"). In the aftermath of the album's success, Zohar was honored by Reshet Gimel and Galgalatz as the new artist of the year and the Singer of the Year in the Galgalatz Annual Parade.

"I Was Excited for You", the first single from Zohar's second album, Thirty-Three, was released in March 2010, and the album followed in March. The album drew upon her experiences in Uganda and Uman and was recorded at Afrokaliptus Studio.

Zohar's third album Lechem, Ahava (Bread, Love) was released in late 2013, having been crowdfunded by her fans. Zohar performed one song in Israeli Arabic, and one song was dedicated to Rona Ramon, the widow of the first Israeli astronaut Ilan Ramon, who was killed in the Space Shuttle Columbia disaster.
