= Urban Cone =

Swedish indie pop band

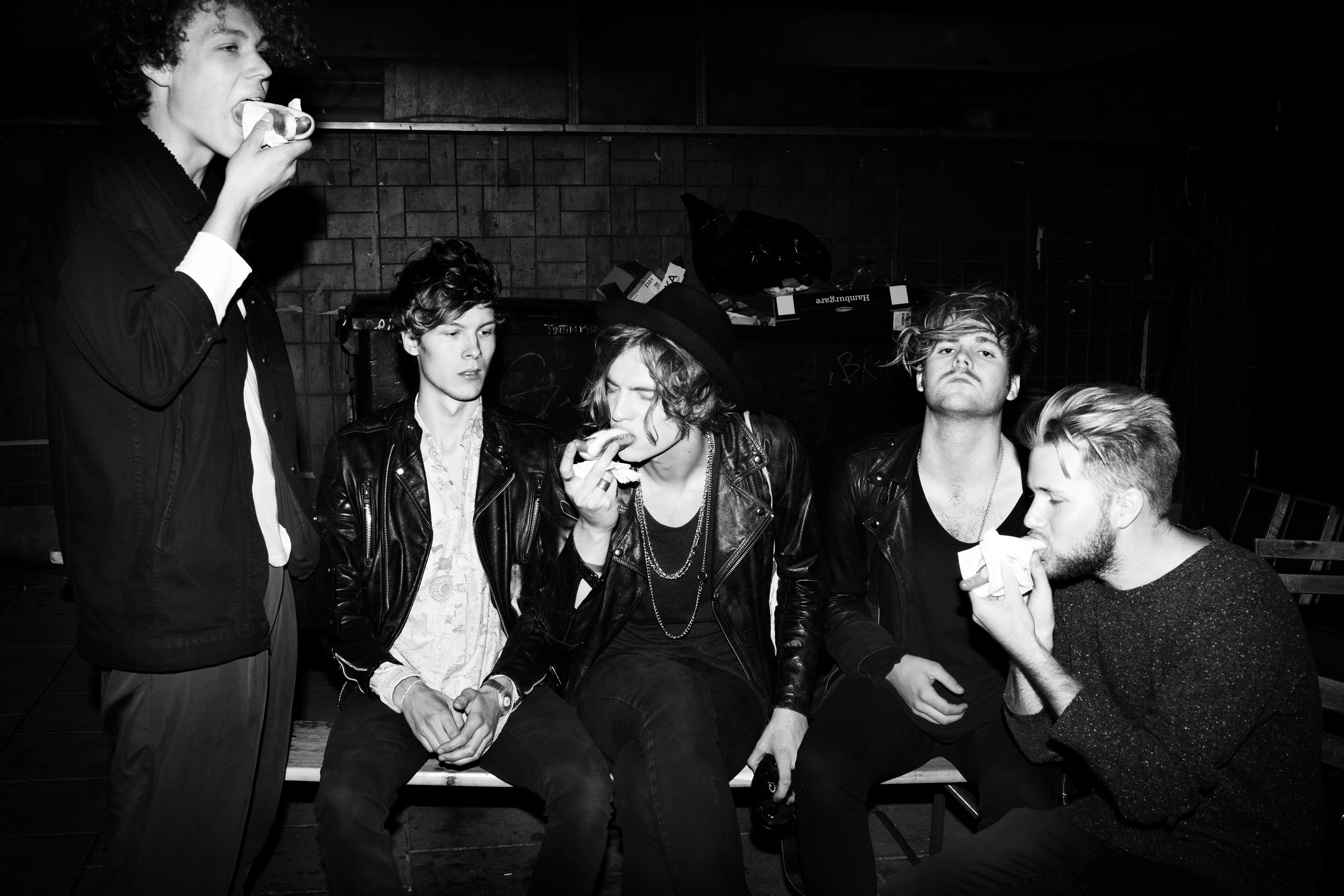
- Urban Cone backstage in 2012

Background information
- Origin: Stockholm, Sweden
- Genres: Electropop; indie pop
- Years active: 2010–2018, 2021
- Labels: Interscope Records; Universal Music Sweden
- Past members: Rasmus Flyckt; Tim Formgren; Emil Gustafsson; Jacob William Sjöberg; Magnus Folkö
- Website: www.urbanconemusic.com

Urban Cone is a Swedish indie pop band from Stockholm, formed in 2010 by current members Emil Gustafsson, Rasmus Flyckt, Tim Formgren, and Jacob William Sjöberg and former member Magnus Folkö while the members, who all shared a passion for music were all still in high school.

The band's debut album, Our Youth was released in 2013 and was produced and recorded in Flyckt's living room. The follow-up second album was Polaroid Memories released in 2015. The band's third album, 10-18, was released in 2018. In 2021, the band announced they're coming back with their new song, Never Enough.

== Music career ==
The group first met success in late 2010 with their debut single, Urban Photograph, which received high praise and exposure on music blogs around the world and reached #2 on Hype Machine after the release of the band's Our Youth EP in December 2012. The EP received positive feedback, with Earmilk writing that “the EP exemplifies what Urban Cone is at its finest, staying true to their roots and presenting honest, gritty dance/pop."

After the release of Our Youth, Urban Cone tried its hand in the U.S. market in January 2013 by performing in New York City, Brooklyn, Los Angeles and San Francisco. On 8 May 2013 the group released their debut album, Our Youth, which received more than nine million streams only a few months after its release. The group has received praise from music blogs such as BrooklynVegan, Vice/Thump, Idolator and Stereogum.

In 2014, Urban Cone collaborated with Porter Robinson on his song "Lionhearted". Their next single, "Sadness Disease" was released on October 7 and described by Billboard as “uplifting at first, but the lyrics are an even deeper dive into sadness, loneliness and exhaustion”. “We write music in an attempt to create sunshine. It’s a reactionary impulse to create light out of the darkness. If you listen to the lyrics, they’re quite dark. It’s serious music that’s made for dancing,” Flyckt said of the song. Urban Cone released their second album, Polaroid Memories, on 29 April 2015.

Urban Cone has collaborated with electronic dance music artists Porter Robinson and John Dahlbäck and fellow Swedish musician Tove Lo.

The group's third and final album, 10-18, was released by Interscope Records/Universal Sweden. The songs are influenced by hip-hop, while retaining effortless Swedish pop melodies. "With the first two albums, we didn’t tell people what the songs were about, because we wanted the audiences to have their own story for what they could be about, but ever since then, we’ve felt like it’s really important for us to tell people what we think in a different way," Gustafsson said about Urban Cone's new sound.

Urban Cone has cited Tame Impala and Arcade Fire as some of their biggest influences.

== Live performances ==
Urban Cone has performed extensively throughout Sweden and Scandinavia at festivals such as Roskilde, Peace & Love, Way Out West, Siesta!, Emmaboda, Reeperbahn, Dockville, Popaganda and Trastock. In January 2013, Urban Cone performed five shows in the U.S., with stops in New York, Brooklyn, Los Angeles and San Francisco. In April 2013, prior to the release of Our Youth, the group toured Austria, Germany and Switzerland.

In March 2015, Urban Cone performed their song "Come Back to Me" with Tove Lo at the SXSW Festival. The group toured Europe with Tove Lo and the U.S. with The Griswolds during 2015.

In early 2017, Urban Cone toured the U.S. in cities such as Brooklyn, N.Y., San Francisco and Los Angeles with labelmates Nightly.

== Discography ==
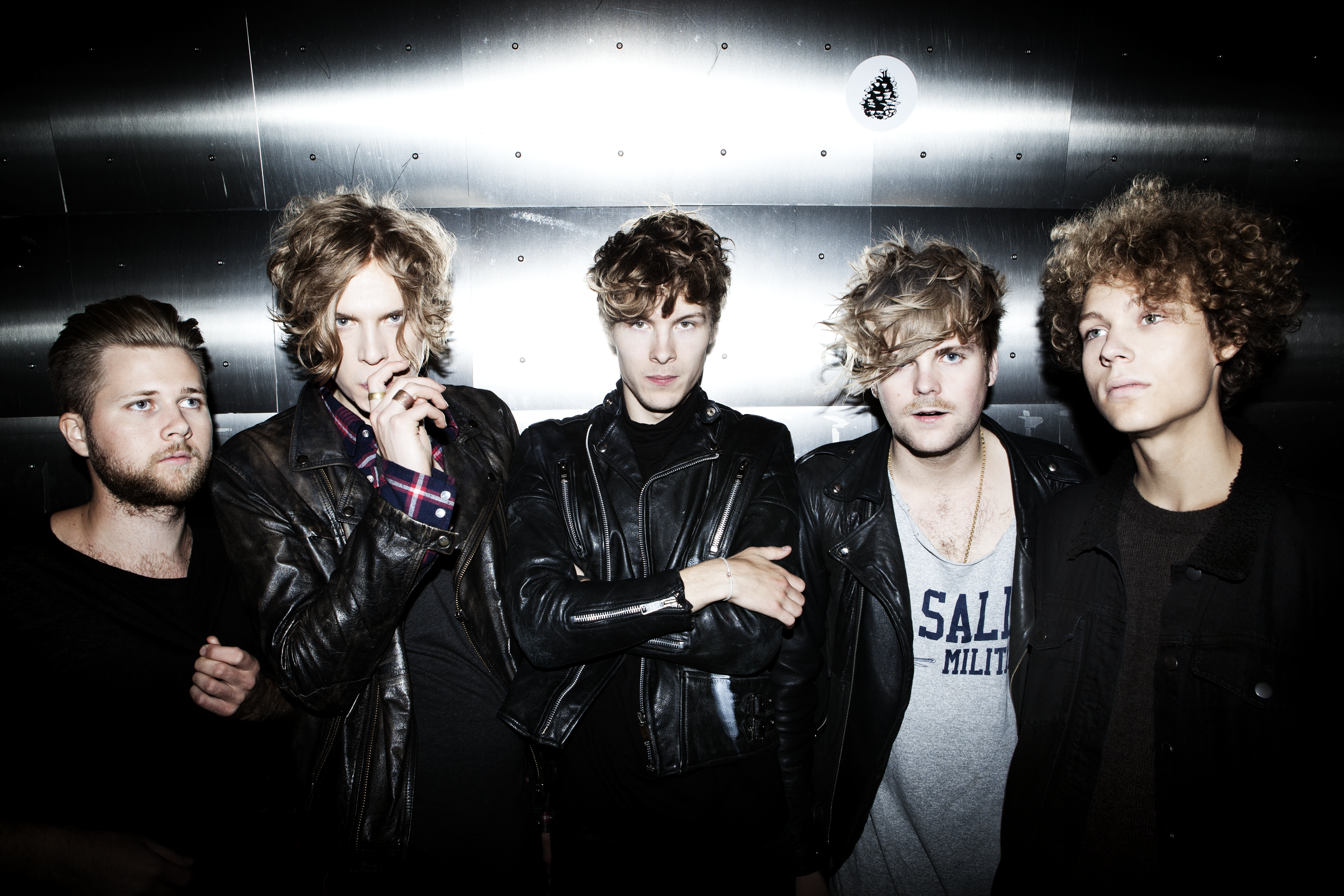
Urban Cone

=== Studio albums ===
Year	Album	Peak positions
Year	Album	SWE
2013	Our Youth	20
2015	Polaroid Memories	26
2018	10-18	–
2021	West Coast	–

=== Extended plays ===
Year	Album	Peak positions
Year	Album	SWE
2012	Our Youth	–

=== Singles ===
Year	Album	Peak positions
Year	Album	SWE
2015	"Come Back to Me" (featuring Tove Lo)	–
2017	"Old School"	45
2017	"Pumping Up Clouds"	–
2018	"Sugar" (featuring Blenda)	–
2021	"Never Enough"	–
2021	"Body Conversation"	–
