= Self Assemble =

Studio album by Mat Zo
- Released: 25 March 2016
- Recorded: 2014–16
- Genre: Electronica; nu-disco; electro house; dubstep; drum and bass
- Length: 44:23
- Label: Mad Zoo
- Producer: Mat Zo

Mat Zo chronology
Damage Control (2013)	Self Assemble (2016)

Singles from Self Assemble
- 1. "Soul Food" Released: 4 February 2016; 2. "Sinful" Released: 3 March 2016

Self Assemble is the second studio album by British electronic musician Mat Zo. It was released on his own record label Mad Zoo, on 25 March 2016. It acts as the follow-up to his debut album Damage Control (2013), and consists of tracks with multiple genres including electro house, dubstep, and funk. The record was initially stated by Mat Zo to be his last electronic album before retiring in 2016 due to conflicts within the electronic dance music scene, before changing his mind on the matter a year later. The record received positive reception from critics who deemed it as a more refined and mature improvement compared to his previous album.

== Background ==
In an interview with Billboard in February 2016, Matan Zohar revealed that Self Assemble could potentially be his last electronic album, calling it "sort of my last send-off before I go and do other things in life." This decision came from his frustration towards the electronic dance music industry, whose music "doesn't last very long in people's minds" and that there's "no feeling of permanence and longevity". Further issues were also highlighted in Zohar's Twitter confessional in May 2015, where he spoke about how he was nearly conned into an unfair contract with Armada Music by Markus Schulz, and about the lack of passion of certain producers, notably Tiësto, in creating electronic music. He also pointed out the presence of 'ghost-producers' in the industry who are professionals hired to create songs for another DJ and remains completely anonymous, and that big-name DJs can simply pay a large sum of money to secure headlining slots for major festivals, which based on Zohar is about $100,000.

While on his MAD tour in January 2017, Zohar appeared to have changed his mind about retiring, with Dancing Astronaut stating that he "exudes a renewed sense of vigor and passion" by sticking to his roots. Zohar commented on how he began to find himself musically by saying that he "grew up" and is "more self conscious" about his standing as an artist. He also mentioned that a "last send-off" was no longer in his mind as Zohar wouldn't know what to do if he had retired early.

I wanted it to be like a score for a movie that doesn't exist. No matter how hard I tried making that score, it just turned into something very personal. In the end, it's just a story about my life over the last three years.

—Matan Zohar, regarding the album's theme

Self Assemble, which was quoted as a "story telling album" by Zohar, represents a "snapshot" of his standing at the time of the album's production. The album's cover art, which portrays a person trapped within a futuristic 3D printer, represents Zohar trying to escape the cage or "EDM Bubble" which he had put himself in. It also represented the general struggle of humans with their boxes, with them attempting to emotionally and spiritually break out of them. The influence for Self Assemble came from late 90s to early 2000s-era dance music, in which Zohar wanted to create permanent "homages to the past". This led to him placing only tracks with non-specific genres on the album, which led to Zohar rejecting a drum and bass track as it felt out of place. Zohar also described the theme of the album as a "score for a film that doesn't exist", as he grew up around classical music and had always wanted to write music for films as a hobby. The record also touches on the topic of dystopianism in the future; about how technology makes everything immediate yet arises new problems as humans approach the singularity.

== Critical reception ==
Professional ratings
Review scores
Source	Rating
Mixmag	7/10
The Music	3/5 stars

Writing for Dancing Astronaut, Christina Hernandez said that the tracks in the record "seem to mirror Zo's current feelings about the state of electronic", with him "translating" the "weight of his jaded thoughts" into each composition. She continued by commenting on the presence of nostalgia as an uplifting role for "Soul Food" and "Sinful", which makes one "reminisce [about] older, carefree times with each instrumental riff". The critic concluded by describing the album as a "more refined extension" from his debut album which has a "matured, jaded feel" combating the optimism presented in the latter. Raymond Murphy of We Rave You noted that the album "flows incredibly well as the tracks move from one to the other almost telling a story of the different styles of electronic music" and observed its similarity to Zohar's 2013 BBC Essential Mix in the way it progresses. Timmy Kusnierek from Your EDM was impressed with the way the tracks "blend together" and the story which was told with "surrealist segments", and capped "Sinful" as an "instant classic".

Beatmash Magazine stated that Self Assemble "strips everything that was not necessary in his previous work [Damage Control]" to focus on building a record which is "conceived as a unique musical piece" where each song "engages with the next". The critic continued by commending the different listening experience upheld in each track and the presence of multiple genres such as future bass, dubstep and progressive house. Mixmag's Ellie Hanagan granted the record a 7/10 rating and commented that although the album "can feel a little disjointed", listeners could "never accuse him [Mat Zo] of being predictable". Roshan Clerke from The Music gave the album a 3/5 rating and felt that Self Assemble was "an imaginary compilation album from a label that doesn't exist". He praising the effective crossing of its tracks across multiple genres and pointed out that the record was "padded with short instrumental tracks that provide just enough respite between tunes and work as efficient transitions".

== Track listing ==
Tracklist adapted from iTunes. All tracks written by Matan Zohar.

No.	Title	Length
1.	"Order Out of Chaos"	3:11
2.	"The Enemy" (featuring Sinead Egan)	3:31
3.	"Sinful" (featuring I See Monstas)	3:47
4.	"Patterns Emerging"	1:41
5.	"Killing Time"	4:19
6.	"Smacked Up On Jack"	1:50
7.	"Ruffneck Bad Boy" (VIP)	4:21
8.	"Lights Out"	4:51
9.	"Soul Food"	5:05
10.	"Stereo No Aware"	5:38
11.	"Too Late" (featuring Sinead Egan)	4:33
12.	"The Last Transmission"	1:36
Total length:		44:23

== Personnel ==
Credits adapted from AllMusic and Genius.

Technical and composing credits

- Matan Zohar – primary artist
- Sinead Egan – featured artist
- Rocky Morris – featured artist
- Rufio Sandilands – featured artist
- Bryn Christopher – featured artist

== Chart positions ==
Chart (2016)	Peak position
US Top Dance/Electronic Albums (Billboard)	7

== Release history ==
Region	Date	Format
Worldwide	25 March 2016	Digital download
United Kingdom	20 June 2016	Vinyl record
Germany	8 July 2016	Vinyl record
