= Damage Control (album) =

Studio album by Mat Zo
- Released: 5 November 2013
- Recorded: 2012–13
- Genre: Electro house; progressive house; electronic
- Length: 58:18
- Label: Anjunabeats, Astralwerks
- Producer: Mat Zo

Mat Zo chronology
Damage Control (2013)	Self Assemble (2016)

Singles from Damage Control
- 1. "The Sky" Released: 13 May 2012; 2. "Easy" Released: 23 November 2012; 3. "Pyramid Scheme" Released: 13 August 2013; 4. "Lucid Dreams" Released: 29 October 2013; 5. "Only For You" Released: 18 February 2014

Damage Control is the debut studio album by British electronic music producer Mat Zo. It peaked at number 1 on the US Billboard Top Heatseekers chart, and number 7 on the US Billboard Dance/Electronic Albums chart. The album was nominated for a Grammy Award for Best Dance/Electronic Album in 2013.

== Track listing ==
All tracks are written by Matan Zohar

No.	Title	Length
1.	"Superman Lost"	2:08
2.	"Only for You" (featuring Rachel K Collier)	5:14
3.	"Easy" (with Porter Robinson)	6:38
4.	"Caller ID"	4:02
5.	"Little Damage"	1:44
6.	"Pyramid Scheme" (featuring Chuck D)	3:30
7.	"The Sky" (featuring Linnea Schossow)	7:55
8.	"Like It Used to Be"	0:59
9.	"Time on Your Side" (featuring Janai)	3:13
10.	"Moderate Stimulation"	1:27
11.	"Lucid Dreams"	4:30
12.	"EZ"	4:14
13.	"Hurricane" (featuring Eyes That Lie)	5:15
14.	"Fall Into Dreams" (featuring Pete Josef)	1:42
15.	"Time Dilation" (bonus track)	5:47
