= Galimatias =

Danish electronic musician

- Born: Matias Saabye Køedt; Fredericia, Denmark
- Genres: EDM
- Occupation: Musician

Galimatias (born Matias Saabye Køedt) is a Danish electronic music artist from the small town of Fredericia, currently based in Los Angeles. He is best known for his 2015 EP Urban Flora, with American singer-songwriter Alina Baraz.

== Career ==
Galimatias began working with Alina Baraz after they were introduced to each other through SoundCloud in 2013, and their songs immediately received blog attention. Their collaborations were collected on an eight-song EP titled Urban Flora, which was released digitally by Ultra Records in 2015, with a vinyl release by Mom + Pop following in 2016. Felix Jaehn's remix of their song "Fantasy" appeared on many dance compilations. Following its release, publications such as The Fader, NPR, Earmilk, Dancing Astronaut, and The Huffington Post praised the album.

On 15 June 2017, Galimatias released the single "Let Me Know". In an interview with Complex, Galimatias stated "I haven't released anything for two years but that didn't mean I stopped making music. I tuned out from social media for a year as well and people started sending me messages asking if I was still alive. I'm definitely not dead, but I don't ever want to create the same sound twice, and it took a good while for me to figure out what I wanted to do after Urban Flora. I have a lot of criteria for myself when I make music, and creating something that hasn't been heard before is definitely one of the highest ranking ones."

In November 2025, Galimatias published his fifth studio album, 20 Second Century.

== Discography ==
Studio albums

- Luna Soul (2012)
- Young Chimera (2013)
- Sunlight Reigns Supreme (2013)
- Renaissance Boy (2020)
- 20 Second Century (2025)

EPs

- Urban Flora (2015)
- Urban Flora (Remixes) (2015)
- The Island of Peach Bellini (with Zeauxi) (2024)

Singles

- "To the Moon & Beyond" (2012)
- "Noelles Eloquence" (2012)
- "Crestfallen (2012)
- "Leaving for Good" (2012)
- "Purple Rain" (2012)
- "Succubus" (2012)
- "Ocean Floor Kisses" (2014)
- "Voice of Reason" (2014)
- "Night Owl" (2014)
- "Drift" (2015)
- "Pretty Thoughts" (2015)
- "Fantasy" (2015)
- "Make You Feel" (2015)
- "Blowback" (2017)
- "Won't Forget" (2017)
- "Let Me Know" (2017)
- "South" (2018)
- "Redeye" (2020)
- "Let Go" (2020)
- "Laying Low" (2020)
- "Shy Dancer" (2020)
- "Bpl" (2024)

Remixes

- "Strawberries (Madeaux Remix)" by Madeaux (2013)
- "Fantasy (Felix Jaehn Remix)" by Felix Jaehn (2015)
- "Fantasy (Vices Remix)" by Vices (2015)
- "Fantasy (Pomo Remix)" by Pomo (2015)
- "Can I (Tez Cadey Remix)" by Tez Cadey (2015)
- "Can I (GEOTHEORY Remix)" by GEOTHEORY (2015)
- "Make You Feel (Hotel Garuda Remix)" by Hotel Garuda (2015)
- "Make You Feel (Kerala Remix)" by Kerala (2015)
- "Make You Feel (Ark Patrol Remix)" by Ark Patrol (2015)
- "Pretty Thoughts (FKJ Remix)" by FKJ (2015)
