= Lionhearted =

Single by Porter Robinson featuring Urban Cone

from the album Worlds
- B-side: "Shepherdess" (vinyl)
- Released: June 17, 2014
- Genre: Synth-pop
- Length: 4:26 (album version); 3:22 (video edit)
- Label: Astralwerks
- Songwriters: Porter Robinson; Ben Swardlick; Eric Luttrell; Andrew Coenen; Emil Anders Gustafsson; Karl Erik Rasmus Flyckt
- Producer: Porter Robinson

Porter Robinson singles chronology
| "Sad Machine" (2014) | "Lionhearted" (2014) | "Flicker" (2014) |

Official music video
- "Lionhearted" on YouTube

"Lionhearted" is a song recorded by the American electronic music producer Porter Robinson featuring the Swedish indie pop band Urban Cone for his debut studio album, Worlds (2014). It was one of the first songs Robinson wrote for the album. He decided to work with Urban Cone after listening to their vocals and finding them adequate for the song. After being premiered by Stereogum and at BBC Radio 1, it was released on June 17, 2014, as the album's third single. Multiple critics found the song influenced by Passion Pit and noted that it was the first on Worlds with a faster tempo. The song's release was accompanied by a music video, set in city streets. It charted in Belgium and the United States.

== Background and composition ==
"Lionhearted"
"Lionhearted" is the first track on Worlds to exhibit a faster tempo. Multiple critics found it influenced by Passion Pit.

"Lionhearted" was one of the first songs Porter Robinson wrote for Worlds. After listening to Urban Cone's vocals, Robinson found them to be the exact tone he needed for "Lionhearted". After flying them to North Carolina, where Robinson produced the album, Urban Cone found the instrumental reminiscent of Space Invaders (1978). Robinson and Urban Cone then wrote the lyrics with an imaginary battle in mind, coinciding with the album's general idea of escapism, fiction, and fantasy. Robinson said that "Lionhearted" was not one of his favorite songs on the album, but he still liked the idea of releasing it as a single, describing it as "anthemic".

In the context of Worlds, critics noted that "Lionhearted" was the first track on the album with a faster tempo. Chris DeVille described the song as having a similar sonic feel to the previous single "Sad Machine", with Robinson "grafting his signature electro-house to the space-age synth-pop" similarly to Passion Pit and M83. Consequence of Sound's Derek Staples found the track similar to the "high-pitched dance-pop" of Passion Pit, in particular their 2009 album Manners; Mike Prevatt of Las Vegas Weekly found it inspired by the band and Holy Ghost!. Garrett Kamps of Spin described the track as "exuberant pop". Andy Kellman wrote to AllMusic that "Lionhearted" "[has] sections muscular and bold enough to move large crowds".

== Release and reception ==
On June 3, 2014, "Lionhearted" was premiered by Stereogum and at BBC Radio 1, where DJ Zane Lowe called it "the hottest record in the world". It was officially released as the album's third single on June 17, accompanied by a music video which features Robinson and a group of women "wreak[ing] havoc around the city streets, resulting in an eruption of [color]", according to Mixmag's Carré Orenstein. Remixes of the song were released as a remix EP on July 15, 2014, and later in a limited edition box set of Worlds. A remix by Point Point appeared on Worlds Remixed (2015).

Elissa Stolman wrote to Vice that "Lionhearted" successfully blends "windows-down teen nostalgia and rave-friendly power synths". DeVille described the song as "a joyride through the galaxy with 'St. Elmo's Fire' blasting louder than the afterburners". A Variance writer said that the illuminating, upbeat track "peels back yet another intriguing layer to Robinson's sound, which is clearly stadium-ready". A writer for The Music said that the song "is sure to be a club banger". Wondering Sound's Barry Walters described "Lionhearted" "uncharacteristically eager-to-please". In a negative note, a writer for Beat described it as "incredibly dated", with "[p]uffy synths and uninspired vocals" that diminish its potential. Rupert Howe of Q found it disappointing that the track approached the "generic stadium trance" Robinson was trying to abandon.

In Belgium, "Lionhearted" charted at Ultratip Bubbling Under, peaking at 40. In the United States, it charted on Billboard's Dance Club Songs, peaking at 9, and Hot Dance/Electronic Songs, peaking at 25. It placed 79 on the latter's year-end chart.

== Track listing ==
"Lionhearted" track listing
| No. | Title | Length |
|---|---|---|
| 1. | "Lionhearted" (featuring Urban Cone) | 4:26 |

Lionhearted (Remixes) track listing
| No. | Title | Length |
|---|---|---|
| 1. | "Lionhearted" (Arty Remix) | 5:17 |
| 2. | "Lionhearted" (The Alexanders Remix) | 5:56 |
| 3. | "Lionhearted" (Giraffage Remix) | 3:59 |
| 4. | "Lionhearted" (Radio Edit) | 3:34 |
| Total length: | | 18:46 |

Limited edition box set: "Lionhearted" 7" single
| No. | Title | Length |
|---|---|---|
| 1. | "Lionhearted" (featuring Urban Cone) | 4:24 |
| 2. | "Shepherdess" | 7:16 |
| Total length: | | 11:40 |

== Personnel ==
Adapted from Spotify.

- Porter Robinson – performer, writer, producer
- Emil Anders Gustafsson – performer, writer
- Karl Erik Rasmus Flyckt – performer, writer
- Ben Swardlick – writer
- Eric Luttrell – writer
- Andrew Coenen – writer

== Charts ==
=== Weekly charts ===
| Chart (2014) | Peak position |
|---|---|
| Belgium (Ultratip Bubbling Under Flanders) | 40 |
| US Dance Club Songs (Billboard) | 9 |
| US Hot Dance/Electronic Songs (Billboard) | 25 |

=== Year-end charts ===
| Chart (2014) | Position |
|---|---|
| US Hot Dance/Electronic Songs (Billboard) | 72 |
