= Easy (Mat Zo and Porter Robinson song) =

Single by Mat Zo and Porter Robinson

from the album Damage Control
- Released: 23 November 2012
- Recorded: 2012
- Genre: Progressive house
- Length: 6:38
- Label: Ministry of Sound; Anjunabeats; Astralwerks; Spinnin'
- Songwriter(s): Matan Zohar; Porter Robinson; Tommy Musto; Mike Rogers
- Producer(s): Matan Zohar; Porter Robinson

Mat Zo singles chronology
"The Sky" (2012)	"Easy" (2012)	"Pyramid Scheme" (2013)

Porter Robinson singles chronology
"Language" (2012)	"Easy" (2012)	"Sea of Voices" (2014)

"Easy" is a song by British producer Mat Zo and American producer Porter Robinson. The song was released as a digital download in the United Kingdom by Ministry of Sound and Anjunabeats on 23 November 2012 and in the United States by Astralwerks on 7 May 2013. It debuted at number 28 on the UK Singles Chart. The track samples vocals from the song "Nothing Better" by Colourblind.

== Background and release ==
According to Mat Zo, "Easy" was first conceived as "EZ", a "garage" version of the song; he then asked Porter Robinson to work on another track based on it. Both versions appear on Mat Zo's late-2013 debut studio album Damage Control. "Easy" is a progressive house song.

An anime-like music video to accompany the release of "Easy" was first released onto YouTube on 8 March 2013 at a total length of three minutes and thirty-four seconds. The creators of this video were the animation group, The Line. The video follows a pop star by the name of Maki. She ignores her manager's attempts to contact her, and then she leaves her apartment complex on a motorcycle, with a large duffel bag. After she has driven a distance on the highway out of the city, she activates it, which causes what would appear to be a large expanding dome of light, possibly an explosion. She calmly and happily waits for the dome to catch up with her after it has consumed the city, and is then floating in a white void in a different art style. Then she appears riding a bicycle amid peaceful scenery matching a photo seen earlier in the video. The video contains many references to the classic anime film Akira. Some are visual, such as the light paths left by motorcycles, but there is at least one plot reference in the form of the explosion that consumes the city.

As of October 2024, the video has received over 16 million views.

== Reception ==
John D. Luerssen wrote to Rolling Stone that "Easy" was "buoyant and inviting". Andy Kellman of AllMusic described it as "one of 2013's most memorable commercial dance singles". In 2017, Tatiana Cirisano of Billboard chose "Easy" as the fourth best track in Robinson's discography at the time. Describing it as "pure joy", she wrote: "With charming vocals, piercing chords and the bubbliest of choruses, it's the type of track that doesn’t age with time, making it all the more legendary." The same year, Vice named it the 42nd best electronic dance music song of all time. In 2019, Billboard staff named it the 36th greatest dance song of the decade. In 2022, Rolling Stone Australia named it the 175th best dance song of all time.

== Track listing ==
Digital download
No.	Title	Length
1.	"Easy" (Radio Edit)	3:32
2.	"Easy" (Andy C Remix)	5:15
3.	"Easy" (Modek 'Bright As Day' Remix)	5:03
4.	"Easy" (Botnek Remix)	6:37
5.	"Easy" (Lemaitre Remix)	3:57
6.	"Easy" (Extended Mix)	6:36

== Chart performance ==
=== Weekly charts ===
Chart (2013)	Peak position
Belgium (Ultratip Bubbling Under Flanders)	92
Scotland (OCC)	21
UK Dance (OCC)	7
UK Indie (OCC)	5
UK Singles (OCC)	28
US Dance Club Songs (Billboard)	11
US Hot Dance/Electronic Songs (Billboard)	29

=== Year-end charts ===
Chart (2013)	Position
US Hot Dance/Electronic Songs (Billboard)	77

== Release history ==
Region	Date	Format	Label
United Kingdom	14 April 2013	Digital download	Ministry of Sound; Anjunabeats
United States	7 May 2013	Digital download	Astralwerks
