= Mat Zo =

British electronic music producer

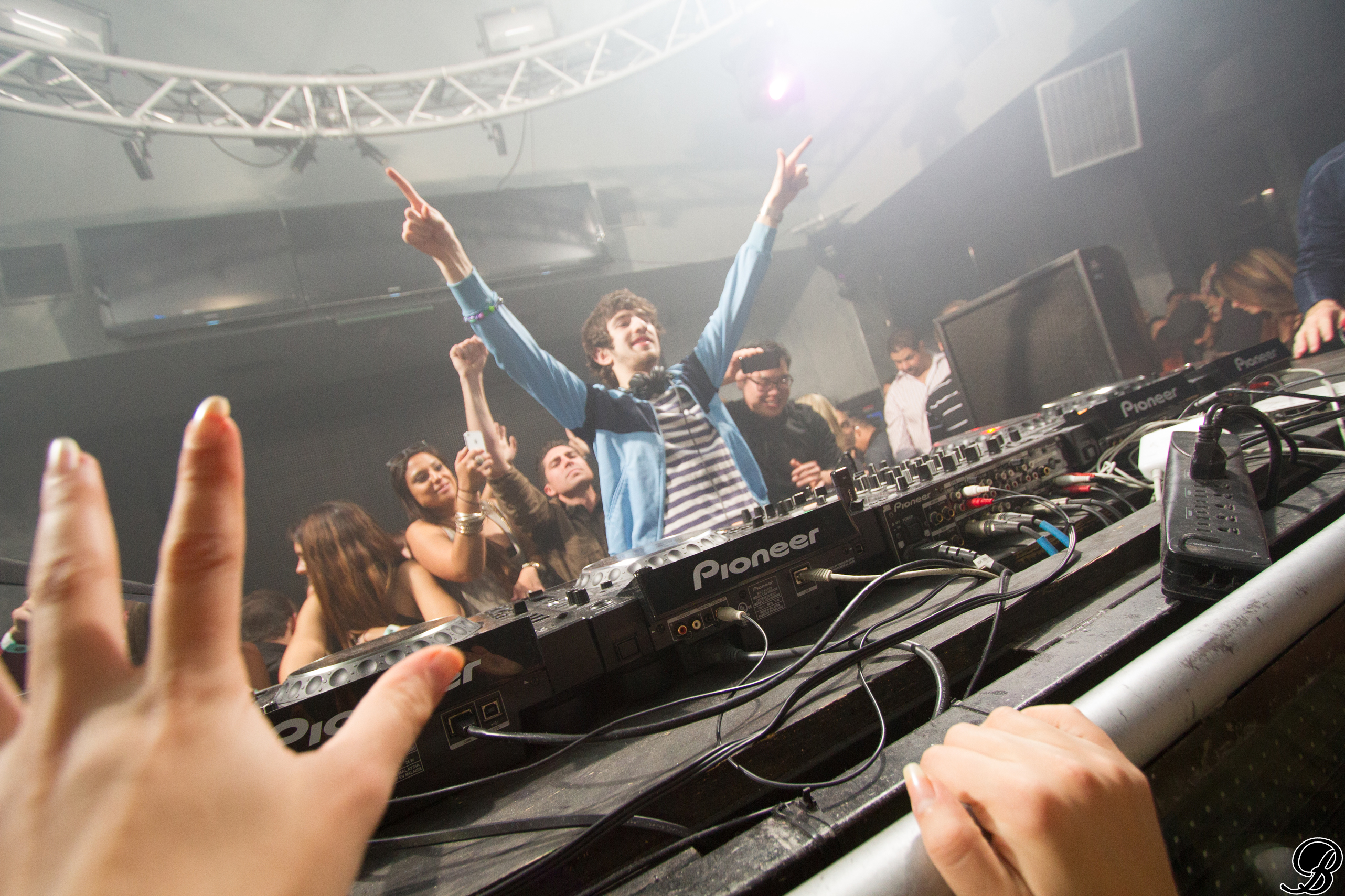
- Mat Zo performing in 2013

Background information
- Also known as: MRSA; MRZO; Unripelemon
- Born: Matan Zohar; 30 April 1990 (age 36); London, England
- Genres: Trance; EDM; progressive house; dubstep; drum and bass; disco house
- Occupations: Disc jockey; Record producer
- Instruments: Keyboards; mixer; synthesizer
- Years active: 2006–present
- Labels: Anjunabeats; Astralwerks; Hospital; Armada; Active; Mad Zoo
- Member of: Kill the Zo; The Mary Nixons
- Website: matzomusic.com

Matan Zohar (/ˈmɑːtən ˈzoʊər/ MAH-tən ZOH-ər; born 30 April 1990), better known by his stage name Mat Zo, is a British-Israeli DJ and electronic music producer. Zohar released his debut album, Damage Control, via the Anjunabeats and Astralwerks labels on 5 November 2013. His second studio album, Self Assemble, was released on 25 March 2016 under his own Mad Zoo label.

== Early life ==
The son of artist Israel Zohar, and half-brother of Israeli singer Alma Zohar, Matan Zohar was born in London on 30 April 1990 and lived in Ohio until the age of eleven before returning to his birthland. He was raised by his mother, Wendy Caron Zohar, a professional violinist who nurtured Matan's early love of and inclination toward music. His father, who is a Kazakhstan-born figurative painter, gifted him a guitar at the age of eight. This interest eventually shifted to his forming musical groups and playing with drums and bass. Zohar began to explore electronic music in his teens by self-learning music production with Logic Pro and taking inspiration from artists like The Chemical Brothers and Daft Punk.

== Career ==
Mat's releases on Anjunabeats have earned substantial critical acclaim, and his collaboration with Porter Robinson, "Easy", reached number eleven on the US Dance Club Songs chart, and number one on Beatport.

On 28 August 2013, Mat Zo announced the title and artwork for his debut album Damage Control as well as a teaser track called "Little Damage". Damage Control was released on 5 November of that year. It garnered immediate critical acclaim and established Mat as an extremely versatile artist who could produce electronic music of all types and genres. Dancing Astronaut called it "an inspiring and timeless artistic debut". The album went on to be nominated for a Grammy Award for Best Dance/Electronic Album.

On 25 March 2016, Mat Zo released his second studio album titled Self Assemble, which he speculated to be his "farewell to the [EDM] industry" due to his disenchantment with the EDM scene as of 2015. "This album is sort of my last send-off before I go and do other things in life. It feels like I'm ready to go and venture off into other realms," stated Mat Zo to Billboard. As of January 2017, Mat Zo appeared to have changed his mind about retiring, with a "renewed sense of vigor and passion", and continues to tour and produce with his main name in addition to two new collectives; Kill the Zo with Kill the Noise and the Mary Nixons with the Knocks.

His earlier drum and bass productions are under the pseudonym MRSA on Hospital Records. He also has several unreleased tracks under the MRSA moniker playable through his Myspace account. Mat has also continued to produce occasional drum and bass releases under his current name, such as "Games" for UKF10 and "Blessed Be Thy Name" for This Is MAD TOO.

Mat Zo revealed through a Reddit "Ask-Me-Anything" on 6 July 2018 that he was working on a third studio album. He returned to Anjunabeats in the same year with the release of his No Words EP, ending his five year hiatus from the label. Mat Zo's "classic" trance and progressive sound within the EP were praised by critics. Mat Zo released his third album, Illusion of Depth, through Anjunabeats in 2020. In 2021, his song "Colours (feat. Olan)" was featured in the racing video game Forza Horizon 5.

== Mad Zoo Records ==
Following the establishment of his own label Mad Zoo in August 2014, Mat Zo has focused his efforts onto expanding his label and creating a platform for upcoming artists. The first compilation on Mad Zoo, This Is Mad Zoo was released on 5 July 2019, which included 12 tracks from various artists including Mat Zo, himself. The second compilation, entitled This Is Mad Too, was released exclusively on Beatport on 20 January, and on all other major streaming platforms on 24 January 2020. This Is Mad Too includes a total of 17 tracks from Mat Zo, Tsuruda, Rohaan, Acrillics, Gladez, Anti.Negative and others. A release party for the compilation was hosted by Bass Waffles in Highland Park, Los Angeles, on 26 January.

== Discography ==
Studio albums

- Damage Control (2013)
- Self Assemble (2016)
- Illusion of Depth (2020)

== Awards and nominations ==
=== Grammy Awards ===
Year	Nominee / work	Award	Result
2015	Damage Control	Best Dance/Electronic Album	Nominated

=== Berlin Music Video Awards ===
Year	Nominee / work	Award	Result
2016	SINFUL	Best Art Director	Nominated

== See also ==
- List of music artists and bands from London
