= AXS (company) =

Ticketing company

AXS.com
- Type: Primary ticket outlet
- Industry: Entertainment
- Founded: 2011
- Headquarters: Los Angeles, California
- Area served: United States, United Kingdom, Sweden, Japan, Australia
- Products: Ticket Sales; Ticketing Technology; Event/Venue Marketing
- Owner: Anschutz Entertainment Group (AEG)
- Number of employees: Full-time: Part-time:
- Website: axs.com

AXS (/ˈæksɛs/; AK-sess) is an American ticket outlet for sports and entertainment events, founded in 2011 and owned by Anschutz Entertainment Group (AEG), the world's second-largest entertainment promoter behind Live Nation Entertainment. AEG operate venues globally, as well as promote events under their AEG Presents banner, meaning these venues and promoted events typically use AXS as their primary ticket outlet.

== Background ==
The initial AXS deployment was August 2011 and venues and services have been added in a phased roll out. As of August 2013, AXS was the exclusive or primary ticket provider for over 30 US venues and nine UK venues. The first Crypto.com Arena concert available only through AXS was Beyoncé in 2013. Although the NBA's Los Angeles Lakers still use Ticketmaster primarily for the majority of tickets, the premium sections in the arena use AXS for Laker games. The Los Angeles Kings of the NHL use AXS for all ticket types, including parking at the arena. The white-label technology Outbox developed enables AEG to sell tickets under either the AXS brand name or under local venue name brands, which have considerable local support, while providing centralized CRM services for either approach.

It was developed and is operated by Anschutz Entertainment Group (AEG) in partnership with Outbox Technology. In September 2019, AEG bought out Outbox's partnership and AXS is now a wholly owned subsidiary of AEG.

In January 2014, AEG announced that AXS had purchased Examiner.com, a user-generated news site, in order to leverage the site's entertainment content. In 2015, AXS merged with the paperless ticketing system Veritix. The combined entity then generated more than $2 billion in annual transactions.

== Outbox technology ==
AEG's partner for eight years, Outbox, developed of the white-label ticket selling technology. Founded in 2005 by husband and wife Jean-Francoys Brousseau and Constance Raymond, Outbox also counted the Cirque du Soleil among its shareholders. After gaining experience with its technology worldwide, in 2011 Outbox created a partnership with AEG, and AXS was born. Their ticket selling system allows all live entertainment venues to control their inventory, pricing, and consumer data without third-party involvement. In 2019, Outbox sold its stake in AXS to AEG.

== Innovations ==
=== Fair AXS ===
AXS aims to block large-volume, automated purchases by computer programs used by ticket resellers by using a "waiting room" facility on a separate server. Users log their personal details and purchase information prior to tickets going on sale and are screened for multiple purchases.

=== AXS Invite ===
AXS selectively offers an add-on feature, AXS Invite, which lets ticket purchasers reserve adjacent seats for friends, who have up to 48 hours to decide on receiving email or social-media notification. Invite is not available when tickets are initially sold, is only available at some venues, and is unlikely to help at oversubscribed shows. AXS acknowledges that the feature is "really about finding a way to sell more tickets", while enhancing customer convenience.

== Partnerships ==
=== Carbonhouse ===
Carbonhouse, a web design agency with over 400 clients worldwide, was acquired by AEG. This will allow integration of additional features into the AXS ticketing platform.

=== StubHub ===
AEG had a partnership with StubHub, a secondary ticketing service, to place tickets from StubHub in AXS ticket listings. This Partnership ended in 2018 when AXS Mobile ID technology and the “FanSight” purchase experience technology will be integrated in 30 of AEG's U.S. venues.
