= List of songs recorded by Porter Robinson =

American musician Porter Robinson has recorded multiple songs. (Note: Songs as Ekowraith and some of Robinson's old releases aren't listed.)

== Songs ==
Legend
Indicates a song released as a single

Song	Album	Writers	Year	Ref.
"100% In The Bitch"	Spitfire	Porter Robinson	2011	
"A.I.ngel (Become God)" (Note: Stylized as "a.i.ngel (Become God)".) (as Virtual Self)	Virtual Self	Porter Robinson	2017	
"Angel Voices" (Note: Stylized in all uppercase.) (as Virtual Self)	—N/a	Porter Robinson	2018	
"Blossom"	Nurture	Porter Robinson	2021	
"Cheerleader"	Smile! :D	Porter Robinson	2024	
"Circle Game (Anohana Ver.)" (with Galileo Galilei)	—N/a	Yūki Ozaki	2023	
"Divinity" (with Amy Millan)	Worlds	Porter Robinson, Amy Millan	2014	
"Do-re-mi-fa-so-la-ti-do" (Note: Stylized in all lowercase.)	Nurture	Porter Robinson	2021	
"Dullscythe"	Nurture	Porter Robinson	2021	
"Easy" (with Mat Zo)	Damage Control	Tommy Musto, Porter Robinson, Mike Rogers, Matan Zohar	2013	
"Easier to Love You"	Smile! :D	Porter Robinson	2024	
"Eon Break" (as Virtual Self)	Virtual Self	Porter Robinson	2017	
"Everything Goes On" (with League of Legends)	—N/a	Brendon Williams, Fredrik Johansson, Hige Driver, Porter Robinson	2022	
"Everything To Me"	Smile! :D	James Ivy, Gavin Bendt, Luke Shippey, Michael Stone, Porter Robinson	2024	
"Fellow Feeling"	Worlds	Porter Robinson	2014	
"Flicker"	Worlds	Porter Robinson	2014	
"Fresh Static Snow"	Worlds	Porter Robinson	2014	
"Fullmoon Lullaby" (with Wednesday Campanella)	Nurture	Porter Robinson	2021	(Note: Extra track in the Japanese version of Nurture.)
"Get Your Wish"	Nurture	Porter Robinson	2020	
"Ghost Voices" (as Virtual Self)	Virtual Self	Porter Robinson	2017	
"Goodbye to a World"	Worlds	Porter Robinson	2014	
"Hear the Bells" (with Imaginary Cities)	Worlds	Marti Sarbit, Porter Robinson, Rusty Matyas	2014	
"Hello" (with Sue Cho and Lazy Rich)	—N/a	Porter Robinson, Richard Billis	2010	
"Hollowheart" (with Amy Millan)	Worlds	Porter Robinson, Amy Millan	2024	(Note: Extra track on the 10th Anniversary Edition of Worlds.)
"Humansongs" (as Po-uta)	—N/a	Porter Robinson	2023	
"I'm On Fire"	—N/a	Porter Robinson	2012	
"Is There Really No Happiness?" (Note: Physical releases of Smile! :D refer to this track as "Is There Really No Happiness Without this Feeling?".)	Smile! :D	James Ivy, Gavin Bendt, Luke Shippey, Michael Stone, Porter Robinson	2024	
"Key" (as Virtual Self)	Virtual Self	Porter Robinson	2017	
"Kitsune Maison Freestyle"	Smile! :D	Porter Robinson	2024	
"Knock Yourself Out XD"	Smile! :D	Porter Robinson	2024	
"Language"	—N/a	Heather Bright, Porter Robinson	2012	
"Lifelike"	Nurture	Porter Robinson	2021	
"Lionhearted" (with Urban Cone)	Worlds	Andrew Coenen, Benjamin Swardlick, Emil Anders Gustafsson, Eric Luttrell, Karl Erik Rasmus Flyckt, Porter Robinson	2014	
"Look at the Sky"	Nurture	Porter Robinson	2021	
"Mirror"	Nurture	Porter Robinson	2020	
"Mother"	Nurture	Porter Robinson	2021	
"Mona Lisa" (with Frost Children)	Smile! :D	Angel Prost, Lulu Prost, Porter Robinson	2024	
"Musician"	Nurture	Gus Lobban, Porter Robinson, Sarah Midori Perry	2021	
"Natural Light"	Worlds	Porter Robinson	2014	
"Particle Arts" (as Virtual Self)	Virtual Self	Porter Robinson	2017	
"Perfect Pinterest Garden"	Smile! :D	Porter Robinson	2024	
"Polygon Dust" (with Lemaitre)	Worlds	Ketil Jansen, Porter Robinson, Ulrik Denizou Lund	2014	
"Russian Roulette"	Smile! :D	Porter Robinson	2024	
"Sad Machine"	Worlds	Porter Robinson	2014	
"Say My Name"	—N/a	Porter Robinson	2010	
"Sea of Voices"	Worlds	Breanne Düren, Porter Robinson	2014	
"The Seconds" (with Jano)	Spitfire	Porter Robinson	2011	
"Shelter" (with Madeon)	—N/a	Hugo Leclercq, Porter Robinson	2016	
"Shepherdess"	—N/a	Porter Robinson	2014	(Note: B-side of the 7" vinyl of "Lionhearted". Robinson later released "Shepherdess (She Heals Everything)", a mix between the original "Shepherdess" and a live edit of the song Robinson debuted during Worlds Live shows, garnering the name "She Heals Everything" by fans and later embraced by Robinson.)
"Something Comforting"	Nurture	Porter Robinson	2020	
"Spitfire"	Spitfire	Porter Robinson	2011	
"Still Here (With the Ones That I Came With)" (with Skrillex and Bibi Bourelly)	Quest for Fire	Sonny Moore, Porter Robinson, Bibi Bourelly, Sheri Nowrozi, Leven Kali	2023	
"The State"	Spitfire	Porter Robinson	2011	
"Sweet Time"	Nurture	Porter Robinson	2021	
"Trying to Feel Alive"	Nurture	Porter Robinson	2021	
"Unfold" (with TEED)	Nurture	Orlando Higginbottom, Porter Robinson	2021	
"Unison"	Spitfire	Rob Swire, Gareth McGrillen	2011	
"Vandalism"	Spitfire	Porter Robinson	2011	
"The Wildcat"	—N/a	Porter Robinson	2011	
"WannaCry" (with Ninajirachi)	—N/a	Nina Wilson, Porter Robinson	2026	
"Wind Tempos"	Nurture	Porter Robinson	2021	
"Year of the Cup"	Smile! :D	Porter Robinson	2024	
"Years of War"	Worlds	Breanne Düren, Porter Robinson, Sean Caskey	2014	

== Unreleased songs ==
- "God Rays" — This is an unreleased track from the Virtual Self project. Robinson played it during a set in Los Angeles on February 8, 2019.
- "Dry Your Eyes" — This is an unreleased track from the Virtual Self project. Robinson played it during a set in Los Angeles on February 8, 2019.
- "unreleased 2019 demo" — This demo is from an unreleased collaboration with Kero Kero Bonito, which Robinson used as a sample in Musician. Robinson announced the unreleased collaboration on March 11, 2021, along with a video showcasing how the song was sampled.
- "Stop My Heart" — This is an unreleased collaboration with Wavedash, which Robinson played during his Breakaway Carolina DJ set on September 29, 2023.
- "Hollowheart" — This track features vocals from Amy Millan and was initially supposed to appear on Worlds in 2014, but Robinson "submitted it too late". It was released on August 12, 2024, Worlds' tenth anniversary, and is featured as a bonus track on the Worlds 10th Anniversary Edition of the album.

== See also ==
- Porter Robinson discography
