= Porter Robinson discography =

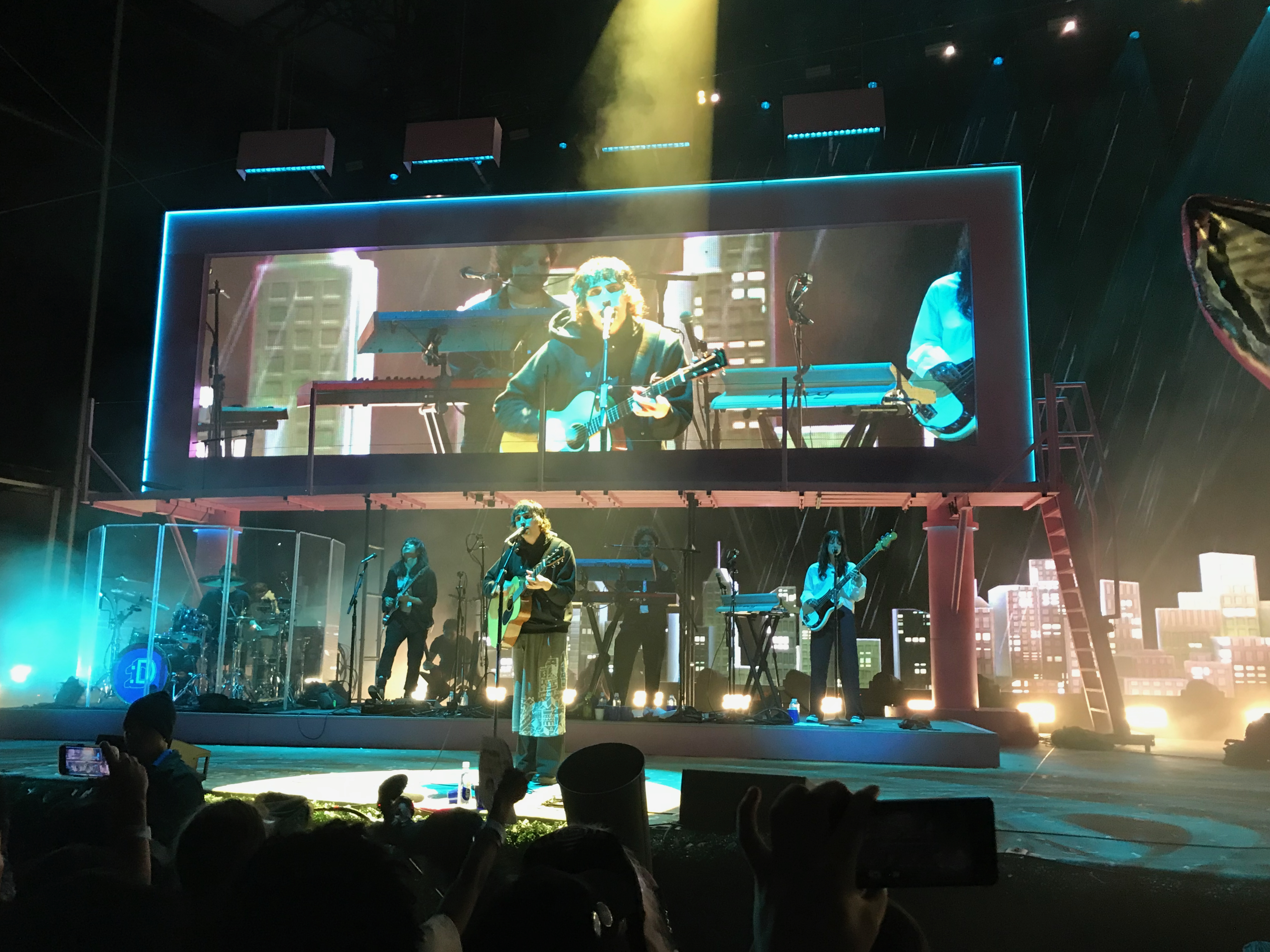
- Robinson performing at the Forest Hills Stadium in 2024
- Studio albums: 3
- EPs: 9
- Live albums: 2
- Remix albums: 2
- Singles: 33
- Music videos: 22

The discography of American musician Porter Robinson consists of three studio albums, two remix albums, three live albums, eight extended plays, one DJ mix, 33 singles, and 22 music videos. He first released music under Ekowraith in 2008, starting with "Booming Track".

His debut EP, Spitfire, marked the artist's first entry into any music charts. Released on September 13, 2011, through OWSLA, the album reached the tenth position on the Heatseekers Albums and the eleventh position on the Dance/Electronic Albums charts, both from Billboard. In 2012, Robinson released "Language", his first single to chart, notably reaching the top 10 in three charts: in the UK, in the UK Dance singles, and in Scotland. The song also received gold certification in Australia.

The following year, he released "Easy" with Mat Zo, which entered five charts and reached the seventh position on the UK Dance singles chart. In 2014, Robinson released his first studio album, Worlds, topping Billboard's Dance Albums chart and reaching 18th place overall on Billboard 200. The album's four singles and two additional songs appeared on the Dance/Electronic Songs chart, with "Sad Machine" receiving gold certification in the United States. He also released the remix album Worlds Remixed.

After a two-year hiatus, in 2016, the artist returned with the single "Shelter", featuring Madeon. This was Robinson's second certified release, getting gold in the United States. In 2017, he introduced the pseudonym Virtual Self, releasing a self-titled EP and two singles, "Eon Break" and "Ghost Voices". The latter entered the Belgium charts and received a Grammy Award for Best Dance Recording nomination in 2019. Robinson released his second studio album, Nurture, on April 23, 2021, topping the Dance/Electronic Albums chart, with all songs from the standard release entering the Dance/Electronic Songs chart. Robinson's third studio album, Smile! :D, was released on July 26, 2024, with singles including "Cheerleader" and "Knock Yourself Out XD". On November 6, 2026, he released the remix album Smile! :D Plus+.

== Albums ==
=== Studio albums ===
List of studio albums, with release date and selected chart positions shown
Title	Details	Peak chart positions									Sales
Title	Details	US	US Dance	US Indie	AUS	CAN	JPN	NL	UK	UK Dance	Sales
Worlds	Released: August 12, 2014 (US); Label: Astralwerks, Virgin EMI; Formats: CD, LP, digital download	18	1	—	13	—	—	96	86	13	WW: 1,000,000
Nurture	Released: April 23, 2021; Label: Mom + Pop Music; Formats: CD, LP, digital download	52	1	6	27	57	74	—	—	5	WW: 130,000; US: 14,000
Smile! :D	Released: July 26, 2024; Label: Mom + Pop Music; Formats: CD, LP, digital download	—	10	—	—	—	—	—	—	—	

=== Remix albums ===
Title	Details
Worlds Remixed	Released: October 2, 2015 (US); Label: Astralwerks, Virgin; Formats: Digital download
Smile! :D Plus+	Released: November 6, 2026; Label: Mom + Pop Music; Formats: Digital download

=== Live albums ===
Title	Details
Secret Sky 2021	Released: April 24, 2021; Formats: Digital download, streaming
Second Sky 2021	Released: September 19, 2021; Formats: Digital download, streaming
Worlds Live at Second Sky 2019	Released: August 12, 2024; Formats: LP

== Extended plays ==
Title	Details	Peak chart positions		
Title	Details	US Dance	US Heat	UK Dance
Hello Remixes Part 1 (with Lazy Rich and Sue Cho)	Released: April 4, 2011; Label: Big Fish Recordings; Formats: Digital download	—	—	—
Spitfire	Released: September 13, 2011; Label: Owsla; Formats: Digital download, CD	11	10	30
Spitfire – Bonus Remixes	Released: July 3, 2012; Label: OWSLA; Formats: Digital download	—	—	—
Easy (Remixes) (with Mat Zo)	Released: April 14, 2013; Label: Anjunabeats; Formats: Digital download	—	—	—
Porter Robinson EP (Japan Limited Edition)	Released: June 5, 2013; Label: KSR, Tower Records; Formats: CD	—	—	—
Lionhearted (Remixes) (featuring Urban Cone)	Released: July 15, 2014; Label: Astralwerks; Formats: Digital download	—	—	—
Shelter: Complete Edition (with Madeon)	Released: February 15, 2017; Label: Sony Music Entertainment Japan; Formats: CD, Blu-ray	—	—	—
Virtual Self (as Virtual Self)	Released: November 29, 2017; Label: Virtual Self; Formats: Digital download	—	21	—
"—" denotes extended play that did not chart or was not released.

== DJ mixes ==
Title	Details
Second Sky 2022 (as Virtual Self, with G Jones)	Released: October 29, 2022; Formats: Digital download, streaming

== Singles ==
=== As a lead artist ===
Title	Year	Peak chart positions										Certifications	Album
Title	Year	US Dance	AUS	BEL	FRA	IRE	JPN	NZ Hot	SCO	UK	UK Dance	Certifications	Album
"Booming Track" (as Ekowraith)	2008	—	—	—	—	—	—	—	—	—	—		Non-album singles
"Get Brain"	2009	—	—	—	—	—	—	—	—	—	—		Non-album singles
"Waiting for Tonight" (as Ekowraith)	2010	—	—	—	—	—	—	—	—	—	—		Non-album singles
"Leaving"	2010	—	—	—	—	—	—	—	—	—	—		Non-album singles
"Say My Name"	2010	—	—	—	—	—	—	—	—	—	—		Non-album singles
"I'm on Fire"	2010	—	—	—	—	—	—	—	—	—	—		Non-album singles
"Hello" (with Lazy Rich and Sue Cho)	2010	—	—	—	—	—	—	—	—	—	—		Non-album singles
"The Wildcat"	2011	—	—	—	—	—	—	—	—	—	—		Non-album singles
"Language" (featuring Heather Bright)	2012	33	53	—	—	63	—	—	4	9	3	ARIA: Gold; BPI: Silver	Non-album singles
"Easy" (with Mat Zo)	2013	29	—	92	—	—	—	—	21	28	7		Damage Control
"Sea of Voices"	2014	28	—	—	—	—	—	—	—	—	—		Worlds
"Sad Machine"	2014	29	—	—	—	—	—	—	—	—	—	RIAA: Gold	Worlds
"Lionhearted" (featuring Urban Cone)	2014	25	—	40	—	—	—	—	—	—	—		Worlds
"Flicker"	2014	34	—	—	—	—	—	—	—	—	—		Worlds
"Shelter" (with Madeon)	2016	16	—	30	126	—	64	—	—	—	—	RIAA: Gold	Non-album single
"Eon Break" (as Virtual Self)	2017	—	—	—	—	—	—	—	—	—	—		Virtual Self
"Ghost Voices" (as Virtual Self)	2017	—	—	19	—	—	—	—	—	—	—		Virtual Self
"Angel Voices" (as Virtual Self)	2018	—	—	—	—	—	—	—	—	—	—		Non-album single
"Get Your Wish"	2020	12	—	—	—	—	—	—	—	—	—		Nurture
"Something Comforting"	2020	12	—	—	—	—	—	—	—	—	—		Nurture
"Mirror"	2020	32	—	—	—	—	—	—	—	—	—		Nurture
"Look at the Sky"	2021	12	—	—	—	—	—	—	—	—	—		Nurture
"Musician"	2021	23	—	—	—	—	—	—	—	—	—		Nurture
"Unfold" (with TEED)	2021	19	—	—	—	—	—	—	—	—	—		Nurture
"Everything Goes On"	2022	9	—	—	—	—	—	10	—	—	—		Non-album singles
"Humansongs" (as Po-uta)	2023	—	—	—	—	—	—	—	—	—	—		Non-album singles
"Circle Game (Anohana Ver.)" (with Galileo Galilei)	2023	—	—	—	—	—	—	—	—	—	—		Non-album singles
"Cheerleader"	2024	12	—	—	—	—	—	—	—	—	—		Smile! :D
"Knock Yourself Out XD"	2024	39	—	—	—	—	—	—	—	—	—		Smile! :D
"Russian Roulette"	2024	—	—	—	—	—	—	—	—	—	—		Smile! :D
"Kitsune Maison Freestyle"	2024	—	—	—	—	—	—	—	—	—	—		Smile! :D
"WannaCry" (with Ninajirachi)	2026	17	—	—	—	—	—	33	—	—	—		Non-album single
"—" denotes single that did not chart or was not released.

=== As a featured artist ===
Title	Year	Album
"Kill Me for Always" (Note: Styled in all lowercase.) (Michael Clifford featuring Porter Robinson)	2025	Sidequest

== Other charted and certified songs ==
Title	Year	Peak chart positions	Certifications	Album
Title	Year	US Dance	Certifications	Album
"Divinity"	2014	35	RIAA: Gold	Worlds
"Goodbye to a World"	2014	—	RIAA: Gold	Worlds
"Years of War"	2014	50		Worlds
"Lifelike"	2021	28		Nurture
"Wind Tempos"	2021	30		Nurture
"Mother"	2021	33		Nurture
"Do-re-mi-fa-so-la-ti-do" (Note: Styled in all lowercase.)	2021	35		Nurture
"Sweet Time"	2021	41		Nurture
"Dullscythe"	2021	43		Nurture
"Blossom"	2021	46		Nurture
"Trying to Feel Alive"	2021	50		Nurture
"Still Here (With the Ones That I Came With)"	2023	27		Quest for Fire

== Remixes ==
Song	Year	Artist	Label	Album
"Venga"	2010	Picco	Glamara	Non-album singles
"Wer Ist Sie?"	2010	Heiko and Maiko	None	Non-album singles
"Less Go!"	2010	Spencer and Hill	Bazooka	Non-album singles
"Seek Bromance"	2010	Tim Berg	Ministry of Sound	Non-album singles
"We No Speak Americano"	2010	Yolanda Be Cool and DCUP	Sweat It Out	Non-album singles
"American Trash"	2011	Innerpartysystem	Red Bull	Never Be Content
"The Edge of Glory"	2011	Lady Gaga	Interscope	Born This Way
"Rock's Massive"	2012	Rock Massive	CAPP	Non-album single
"The Thrill"	2015	Nero	MTA; Mercury	Between II Worlds
"Get Your Wish" (as DJ Not Porter Robinson)	2020	Porter Robinson	Mom+Pop	Nurture
"Knock Yourself Out XD" (with Ashelyy, as DJ Not Porter Robinson)	2026	Porter Robinson	Mom+Pop	Smile! :D
"Cheerleader" (as DJ Not Porter Robinson)	2026	Porter Robinson	Mom+Pop	Smile! :D

== Songwriting and production credits ==
Title	Year	Artist	Album	Credits
"Clarity"	2012	Zedd	Clarity	Songwriter
"GTFO"	2018	Mariah Carey	Caution	Songwriter; producer
"Air On Line"	2019	Anamanaguchi	[USA]	Songwriter; producer
"Star Guardian 2022 - Official Orchestral Theme"	2022	League of Legends	Non-album single	Songwriter; producer
"Hazel Theme"	2023	Skrillex	Quest for Fire	Songwriter
"Losing My Mind"	2025	Adjuzt	Non-album single	Songwriter; producer
"Wantchu"	2025	Keshi	Non-album single	Songwriter; producer
"Don't Make Me Cry"	2025	Frost Children	Sister	Songwriter; producer
"Paris"	2026	Illenium	Odyssey	Songwriter
"Changes"	2026	Joey Valence & Brae	Hyperyouth (Afterparty)	Songwriter

== Music videos ==
Title	Year	Director(s)
"Language"	2012	Jonathan Desbiens
"Easy" (with Mat Zo)	2013	Louis and McCourt
"Sad Machine"	2014	—
"Lionhearted" (featuring Urban Cone)	2014	Jodeb
"Flicker"	2014	Adam Goodall
"Shelter" (with Madeon)	2016	Toshihumi Akai
"Eon Break" (as Virtual Self)	2017	—
"Particle Arts" (as Virtual Self)	2018	140/fth:iyomaroo
"Ghost Voices" (as Virtual Self)	2018	Porter Robinson
"Key" (as Virtual Self)	2018	140/fth:iyomaroo
"Get Your Wish"	2020	Chris Muir
"Something Comforting"	2020	Chris Muir and Carlos Lopez Estrada
"Mirror"	2020	Porter Robinson
"Look at the Sky"	2021	Chris Muir
"Musician"	2021	Waboku and Mah
"Dullscythe"	2021	Jie Liou
"Do-re-mi-fa-so-la-ti-do"	2021	Chris Muir
"Everything Goes On"	2022	Unknown
"Cheerleader"	2024	Hugh Mulhern
"Knock Yourself Out XD"	2024	*Uncanny
"Easier to Love You"	2024	Tomoyasu Murata
"Year of the Cup"	2024	Malcolm MacMaster and Porter Robinson

== See also ==
- List of songs recorded by Porter Robinson
