= I'm on Fire (disambiguation) =

"I'm on Fire" is a 1984 song and the fourth single of Bruce Springsteen's album Born in the USA.

I'm on Fire may also refer to:

- "I'm on Fire" (Jerry Lee Lewis song), 1965
- "I'm on Fire" (5000 Volts song), 1975
- "I'm on Fire" (Dwight Twilley Band song), 1975
- "I'm on Fire", a song from Barry White's 1979 album The Message Is Love
- "I'm on Fire", a song from The Furze's 2007 album Subterranean Kicks
- "I'm on Fire", a song from Nico Vega's 2014 album, Lead to Light
- "I'm on Fire", a song from Marianne Faithfull's 2002 album Kissin Time
- "I'm on Fire" a song from Mystikal's 1998 album, Ghetto Fabulous
- "I'm on Fire" a song from Nas's 2022 album, King's Disease III
- "I'm on Fire", a 2010 song by Porter Robinson
- "I'm on Fire", a song from Rascal Flatts's 2014 album Rewind
- "I'm on Fire", a song from Slightly Stoopid's 2012 album Top of the World
- "I'm on Fire", a song from Stateless's 2011 album, Matilda
- "I'm on Fire", a song from Virgin Steele's 1985 album, Noble Savage
- "I'm on Fire", a song from We Are Messengers's 2016 eponymous debut album
