= Samuel Burgess-Johnson =

English art director and photographer

- Known for: Graphic design, photography
- Website: www.samuelburgessjohnson.com

Samuel Burgess-Johnson is an English art director, graphic designer and photographer known for working with musical artists such as The 1975, Tove Lo, Wolf Alice and No Rome.

== Career ==
Samuel Burgess-Johnson moved to Melbourne after finishing university and began working as an art director. He has worked with artists such as Usher, Wolf Alice, AlunaGeorge, Pale Waves and Coasts. He has also worked with brands such as Unilever and Nike, Inc.

He is the art director for English indie rock band The 1975, whose lead singer Matty Healy was his flatmate. He came up with the cover for their debut EP Facedown together with Healy. Burgess-Johnson introduced the Filipino music artist No Rome to Healy, who subsequently signed him to the label Dirty Hit.

Burgess-Johnson designed the cover art for The Franklin Electric's 2017 album Blue Ceilings. He was nominated for a Grammy Award for The 1975's album I Like It When You Sleep, for You Are So Beautiful yet So Unaware of It.

In 2018, Burgess-Johnson relocated from Dalston to Los Angeles where he produced cover art for bands such as Thirty Seconds to Mars, Ta-ku, and Wafia.

He contributed to Porter Robinson's 2021 album Nurture, by taking the photographs featured in the artwork, as well as helping direct the 2020 music video for the single "Get Your Wish".

Burgess-Johnson created the album cover for beabadoobee's upcoming 2026 album Pylon. The cover features trinkets found in the bottom of the bag that beabadoobee takes on tour.
