= Unfold (song) =

2021 single by Porter Robinson and TEED

Single by Porter Robinson and TEED

from the album Nurture
- Released: April 22, 2021
- Genre: Electronic; shoegaze
- Length: 4:45
- Label: Mom + Pop
- Songwriters: Porter Robinson; Orlando Higginbottom
- Producers: Porter Robinson; Orlando Higginbottom

Porter Robinson singles chronology
"Musician" (2021)	"Unfold" (2021)	"Everything Goes On" (2022)

TEED singles chronology
"Heartbreak / 6000 ft." (2020)	"Unfold" (2021)	"The Distance" (2021)

Music video
- "Unfold" on YouTube

"Unfold" is a song by American record producer Porter Robinson and British singer-songwriter and producer Orlando Higginbottom, known professionally as TEED. (Note: TEED was known professionally as Totally Enormous Extinct Dinosaurs at the time of release.) It is the sixth and final single from Robinson's second album Nurture, released on April 22, 2021, one day before the rest of the album, by Mom + Pop Music. The song is the only listed collaboration on Nurture; (Note: Though they are not listed as collaborators on the songs, Robinson has stated that "Musician" features samples taken from an unreleased song he made in collaboration with Kero Kero Bonito, some instruments on "Wind Tempos" were performed by Masakatsu Takagi, and that the guitar part on "Look at the Sky" was performed by Yvette Young. Additionally, the Japan-only release of Nurture features a bonus track titled "Fullmoon Lullaby", a collaboration with Wednesday Campanella.) Robinson has stated that this was a contributing factor in making the song a callback to his debut album Worlds (2014). "Unfold" released to general critical acclaim. On May 19, 2021, a lyric video for the song was released.

== Background and composition ==
I remember a moment with [Higginbottom] where I was just like, "Dude, I don't know about this. It's cool, I think we can come up with something a little more special." It was like if you're a little bit drunk and somebody hits you with ice water in the face. They're like, "Dude, sober up." He was like, "This is really great. Just sit down on the chair and keep producing for another hour and see what happens." And I've carried that voice with me to the studio so much for the ensuing couple of years.

— Porter Robinson

Following the release of his previous album Worlds (2014), Robinson had set high expectations for himself, saying in 2018 that he felt he was "under a lot of pressure to do something akin to a follow-up". However, in the years following the album's release, this led to an extended period of depression and writer's block during which he released very little music. According to Robinson, Nurture (2021) was a way of "finding the beauty in everyday and reality as it is". Dancing Astronaut's David Klemow felt that "Unfold" also reflects Robinson's struggles with depression and his fear of being unable to live up to the standard of Worlds.

Being a longtime admirer of Higginbottom's music, Robinson decided to collaborate with him for a song on Nurture. During the writing process, Higginbottom expressed his appreciation for "Sea of Voices" (2014), a song from Worlds. This led Robinson to write the instrumentation in a similar style to his older music, while still retaining some distinctive elements of his newer works. Robinson's own singing voice – which can be heard on the other singles from the album – appears on this song, increased in pitch to sound more feminine. As a result of "Unfold" now talking on a more maximalist tone, Robinson made the decision to place it towards the conclusion of the record rather than earlier, as he felt it to be "an end-of-album moment".

== Release and critical reception ==
"Unfold"
Critics noted the confluence of several stylistic influences present in "Unfold". (Note: Attributed to multiple sources:) The drum production received mixed critical reception.

"Unfold" was released by Mom + Pop Music on April 22, 2021. The song was mostly acclaimed by critics, who noted its highly emotional writing. Magnetic Magazine's Ryan Middleton felt that the song was Nurture's "crown jewel", commending the collaboration between Robinson and Higginbottom, and comparing it favorably with Robinson's previous collaborative works "Easy" (2013) and "Shelter" (2016). Klemow also praised Higginbottom's involvement, saying that his "stylistic sensibilities [elevate] the best of [Robinson]'s sonic qualities".

Reviewers noted that while the song contains strong electronic elements – The Fader's Jordan Darville calling the song Nurture's "most rave-minded track" – it also combines them with shoegaze stylistic influences. PopMatters's Chris Conaton felt that the song places more emphasis on vocal melodies, using the instruments in a more secondary role. While Triple J's Sose Fuamoli felt that the drums were "punching" and "emphatic", Slant's Charles Lyons-Burt found them to be "diffuse" and "evocative of clanging sheet metal". In the context of Nurture's other songs, The Line of Best Fit's Sophie Walker felt that the song was "somewhat anticlimactic thirteen tracks deep".

A lyric video for the song was released on YouTube on May 19, 2021. The video was made by Eric Ko with creative direction by Robinson and Samuel Burgess-Johnson, who has collaborated with Robinson on other music videos.

== Charts ==
Chart performance for "Unfold"
Chart (2021)	Peak position
US Hot Dance/Electronic Songs (Billboard)	19
