= Nurture (album) =

Studio album by Porter Robinson
- Released: April 23, 2021
- Recorded: June 14, 2015 – December 12, 2020
- Genres: Electronica; ambient; synth-pop; electropop
- Length: 59:01
- Label: Mom + Pop
- Producer: Porter Robinson

Porter Robinson chronology
Worlds (2014)	Nurture (2021)	Smile! :D (2024)

Singles from Nurture
- 1. "Get Your Wish" Released: January 29, 2020; 2. "Something Comforting" Released: March 10, 2020; 3. "Mirror" Released: August 26, 2020; 4. "Look at the Sky" Released: January 27, 2021; 5. "Musician" Released: March 3, 2021; 6. "Unfold" Released: April 22, 2021

Nurture is the second studio album by the American electronic music producer Porter Robinson, released on April 23, 2021, by Mom + Pop Music. The album was written in the years following Robinson's debut album Worlds (2014), a period when Robinson struggled with mental illness and writer's block. As a result, the album represents a significant stylistic shift in his work; critics noted that the album features a greater emphasis on acoustic instruments and personal lyrics, while retaining many elements of the innovative electronic style of Worlds. The album also prominently features Robinson's voice, as well as a processed, higher-pitched version. The album features themes of depression, and of learning to find beauty in everyday life and the natural world. Several songs also explore themes of family and love for the first time in Robinson's discography.

Several singles were released for the album, beginning with "Get Your Wish" in January 2020. Originally planned for release in September 2020, the album was delayed by the COVID-19 pandemic, leading Robinson to alter the tracklist and release additional singles. Nurture released to general critical acclaim, entering popular charts in several regions, including at number one on the Billboard Top Dance/Electronic Albums in the United States. The album was also featured on the year-end lists of several publications. Between September 2021 and November 2023, Robinson performed the album in multiple regions as part of the Nurture Live tour.

== Background ==
Porter Robinson experienced an initial surge of popularity at age 18, after the release of several festival-oriented electronic dance music works such as "Say My Name" (2010) and Spitfire (2011). Robinson grew increasingly dissatisfied with his performances, and said that he experienced "four or five fully-blown anxiety attacks onstage" while touring in 2013. His desire to change his musical style led him to write his debut album Worlds (2014), a work that DJ Mag's John Ochoa has retrospectively described as a "breakthrough" that precipitated a wider shift in the electronic music industry.

As a result of the album's positive reception, Robinson had set high expectations for himself, saying in 2018 that he felt he was "under a lot of pressure to do something akin to a follow-up". However, in the years following the album's release, this led to an extended period of depression and writer's block during which he released very little music. In 2016, Robinson released "Shelter", a collaboration with his friend and fellow electronic producer Madeon. In 2017, Robinson released Virtual Self, a eurodance- and trance-inspired production released under an alias of the same name. "Ghost Voices", a single from the EP, was nominated for the Grammy Award for Best Dance Recording in 2018.

== Composition and development ==
On the composition of Nurture, Robinson said that it "came after a period of real creative struggle and just a very difficult time emotionally". He claimed that he produced a hundred demos attempting to replicate Worlds's style, but eventually decided that "Worlds itself became something for [him] to resist". This resulted in lyrical content that focuses on the topics of depression and writer's block, according to AllMusic's Paul Simpson. Our Culture's Konstantinos Pappis wrote that the album as a whole places more emphasis on lyrics. For the album's title, Robinson considered "Only Hope" before Nurture was ultimately chosen due to its similarity with the word "nature". The choice of Nurture as the album's title also serves as a reference to the nature versus nurture debate, which Robinson hoped could "make [people] feel like they can change the way they think of themselves and improve themselves."

The Line of Best Fit's Sophie Walker noted that this is the first time that Robinson has prominently featured his singing voice in his work. PopMatters's Chris Conaton also wrote that songs such as "Look at the Sky" often harmonize his voice with a heavily processed version, which is autotuned and increased in pitch to sound more feminine. According to Robinson, the processed version of his voice served to add a "corruption and artificiality" to the sound, while also giving "a way of not having to risk the rejection of really trying to sing".

Several critics identified significant differences between Nurture and Robinson's previous works. Robinson stated that he followed an approach of "no supersaws, no 808 subs, [and] no classic breakbeats" for most of the songs on the album, which Pappis ascribed to his resolve to avoid the "strictures of dance music". With this pursuit of what Robinson referred to as a "less dance-y sound", he moved away from "drop-driven" songwriting and employed different styles. Walker highlighted the experimentation displayed in "Dullscythe" and "Wind Tempos" in particular, calling it "Nurture's foundation". MusicOMH's Ben Devlin felt that the album is more similar to pop and indie styles, while still retaining some heavier electronic elements. Critics also discussed the album's diverse instrumentation, with NME's Ben Jolley highlighting Robinson's use of the piano, which he felt was "pivotal in his recovery [from depression]".

In January 2020, Robinson announced the album and released its lead single, "Get Your Wish". The announcement was made through a video that featured cryptic messages and hints, including obscured links and geographic coordinates. Nurture was originally intended to be released in September 2020, but was delayed due to the COVID-19 pandemic. As a result, Robinson altered the tracklist, extending the length of the album from 11 to 14 songs, and released additional promotional singles. In March, Robinson and Samuel Burgess-Johnson conducted a photoshoot for the album cover, experimenting with several ideas before deciding to use a picture in which Robinson dropped into a bed of flowers on an impulse. Robinson saw the cover as indicative of the album's personal tone, saying "I struggle to be bold and it's a bold album cover." On December 18, Robinson announced that the album was complete, and would release in "a few months". The release date was later announced to be April 23, 2021.

== Themes and style ==
Several songs on Nurture explore Robinson's struggles with depression and writer's block. Simpson wrote that "Mirror" and "Something Comforting" both address Robinson's self-critical inner voice, while "Musician" focuses on overcoming the burnout that was preventing him from writing music. Lyons-Burt felt that "Look at the Sky" has a "sense of disillusionment", but Pitchfork's Colin Joyce noted that it also looks ahead to a brighter future, calling it a "ballad of hard-won optimism". Jolley felt that the closing song "Trying to Feel Alive" also reflects Robinson's struggles with his mental health. However, Joyce felt that the song shows Robinson has realized that "struggle gives life its color in the first place". According to Simpson, Robinson expresses the futility of striving for a "finish line", and instead learning to find fulfillment in simply living and creating music.

"Lifelike"
Spectrum Culture's Aaron Paskin felt that the use of acoustic instruments and natural sounds in "Lifelike" serves as an example of Nurture's themes.

According to Robinson, Nurture has a focus on "finding the beauty in everyday and reality as it is", which is reflected in the album's tagline of "everything we need is already here". This idea of finding beauty had left an impression on Robinson after watching Wolf Children. He contrasted this with Worlds, which he felt was more about "escaping to faraway dreamlands". Jolley felt that Robinson's rediscovery of "the beauty of everyday life" led to a renewed appreciation for the natural world. As a result, the album incorporates more organic sounds, as well as more acoustic instruments like the piano and orchestra. Paskin noted this theme in the opening song "Lifelike", which makes use of piano, strings, and ambient bird sounds; Robinson himself described the song as "a window into the worldview of Nurture". However, multiple critics noted the juxtaposition of artificial and natural elements in the album, such as the clean and processed versions of Robinson's voice, and the usage of synthesizers along with the acoustic instruments.

Robinson explores a new theme of family on Nurture, dedicating a song to his mother, and two to his partner Rika Mikuriya; Jolley wrote that here Robinson renders himself "more vulnerable than ever before". According to Pappis, "Sweet Time" describes the feeling of falling so deeply in love that one faces "the fear of dying for the first time". Simpson noted the contrast between the introspection of the album and the "fantasy, escapism, and technology" of Robinson's previous works. Joyce especially highlighted the thematic differences with the music video of "Shelter", which features a simulation that is created to escape a dystopic reality. Jolley concluded that the closing quote of "Mirror" (Note: "Mirror" closes with the following spoken lines: "Sometimes, the inner voice is encouraging, calling for you to run those final few yards. You're nearly there. Keep going, keep going; [...] it will all be okay in the end.") is a reflection of "[Robinson]'s journey as an artist" and the message of the album as a whole. Reflecting on the overall tone of the album, Robinson said that it is "very melancholic; there's a lot of pain, there's a lot of sadness, but there's also a lot of hope". Paper's Matt Moen considers this hope to be what Nurture is ultimately about, noting that the album's liner notes includes a wish from Robinson for listeners to be "reminded that life is worthwhile".

Critics noted multiple influences on Robinson's stylistic choices on the album. Spectrum Culture's Aaron Paskin found the reflective lyrics and piano riff of "Get Your Wish" to be reminiscent of Bon Iver's "33 'God' " (2016). Both Conaton and Slant's Charles Lyons-Burt identified a reference to the piano riff of LCD Soundsystem's "All My Friends" (2007), with Conaton also noting a reference to the Postal Service's "Such Great Heights" (2003) in "Dullscythe". Paskin compared the sampling technique used in "Musician" to the approaches of Daft Punk. Walker noted that Robinson's work is heavily influenced by J-pop and Japanese culture, and "Do-re-mi-fa-so-la-ti-do", according to Simpson, contains elements from the Shibuya-kei genre. Reviewers also attributed the more atmospheric tone in some songs to the influence of Joe Hisaishi and the soundtracks of Studio Ghibli's films, with Conaton finding similarities in "Wind Tempos", and Walker citing the opening song "Lifelike". Speaking about the ambient songs, Robinson stated that Masakatsu Takagi and his work on the soundtrack of Wolf Children (2012) were "one of the first inspirations". Additionally, Robinson has said that his contemporary Madeon was a major inspiration for his work, and cited the album Good Faith (2019) as a key influence for Nurture.

== Release and touring ==
Nurture was released by Mom + Pop on April 23, 2021. The album debuted at number one on the Billboard Top Dance/Electronic Albums chart – the second of Robinson's albums to do so – and appeared on national charts in several other regions including Australia and Japan. According to MRC Data, the album earned an equivalent of 14,000 album sales in its first week.

Robinson premiered the album's live set on April 24, 2021, at Secret Sky, his own virtual festival. The performance was streamed online, and featured "live edits" of several songs from Nurture and Worlds. Robinson played the live set in person for the first time at his music festival Second Sky in September 2021. This was followed by the Nurture Live tour, which played in North America from September–November 2021, and was the highest-grossing electronic music tour of 2021. Dates for a European tour were announced later that year, which he played in April 2022. Robinson played on an Asian tour in March 2023, and performed his last set for an extended North American tour at the Coachella festival on April 23, 2023. In November 2023, Robinson played several concerts as part of an Australian tour.

=== Singles ===
Nurture was preceded by six singles to promote its release. The leading single "Get Your Wish" released on January 29, 2020, and "Something Comforting" released on March 10, 2020. Following the album's delay and tracklist alterations, "Mirror" released on August 26, 2020, "Look at the Sky" released on January 27, 2021, and "Musician" released on March 3, 2021. "Unfold", a collaboration between Robinson and TEED, released on April 22, 2021, one day before the album.

== Critical reception ==
Professional ratings
Aggregate scores
Source	Rating
AnyDecentMusic?	7.5/10
Metacritic	78/100
Review scores
Source	Rating
AllMusic	3.5/5 stars
Clash	8/10
The Line of Best Fit	9/10
MusicOMH	4/5 stars
NME	4/5 stars
Our Culture	4.5/5 stars
Pitchfork	7.6/10
PopMatters	7/10
Slant Magazine	3/5 stars
Spectrum Culture	75%

According to review aggregator site Metacritic, Nurture received "generally favorable reviews" based on a weighted average score of 78 out of 100 from 8 critic reviews. Review aggregator AnyDecentMusic? reports an overall score of 7.5 out of 10 based on 7 critic reviews.

Reviewers praised Nurture's composition, with Conaton highlighting Robinson's "knack for melody", and Devlin noting that the songwriting is "cutesy but massively endearing". Clash's Josh Crowe felt that Robinson's vocals have a "wonderful rawness" that complement the euphoric messages of songs such as "Look at the Sky". Jolley also noted a "jubilant energy" on "Something Comforting" and "Musician". Pappis considers "Blossom" to be the album's "most heartfelt moment", effectively condensing Robinson's love and the "simple transcendence" of his realization to appreciate everyday life. Joyce felt that Nurture "mirror[s] the twists and turns of his headspace". Paskin wrote that Robinson was able to produce Nurture by "freeing himself of the pressure to recapture the success of Worlds", and felt that the album is a worthy sophomore work due to its distinct identity.

Multiple reviewers expressed their appreciation for the album's sonic palette, with Simpson noting the "rippling pianos [and] lush acoustic guitars ... along with propulsive beats [and] neon synths", and Devlin writing about engaging sound design, such as the "crispy downsampled guitar" on "Do-re-mi-fa-so-la-ti-do". While Paskin showed a regard for Robinson's experimentation on "Dullscythe", citing his "[virtuosic] production skills", Pappis felt that songs like "Mother" and "Sweet Time" are among the "weakest cuts" from the album, and are sonically unable to match the emotional intensity of the lyrics. Lyons-Burt also found "Mother" to be "cacophonous" due to its drum production. Additionally, Devlin felt that the album is slightly repetitive, with Paskin commenting that the "pop tunes do tend to run together". Walker wrote that the length of the album obscured some of the highlights, and added that even "Unfold" felt "somewhat anticlimactic thirteen tracks deep".

=== Year-end lists ===
Appearances on year-end lists
Publication	List	Rank	Ref.
Billboard	Best Albums of 2021	30	
The Fader	50 Best Albums of 2021	1	
Our Culture	50 Best Albums of 2021	1	
Paste	50 Best Albums of 2021	41	
Slant Magazine	50 Best Albums of 2021	30	

== Track listing ==
All tracks are written by Porter Robinson, except where noted.

Nurture track listing
No.	Title	Writer(s)	Length
1.	"Lifelike"		1:35
2.	"Look at the Sky"		5:10
3.	"Get Your Wish"		3:39
4.	"Wind Tempos"	Robinson; Amy Allen; Elliot Jacobson; Christopher Leon	6:04
5.	"Musician"	Robinson; Sarah Midori Perry; Gus Lobban	3:59
6.	"Do-re-mi-fa-so-la-ti-do"		3:35
7.	"Mother"		3:46
8.	"Dullscythe"		4:00
9.	"Sweet Time"		4:12
10.	"Mirror"		5:07
11.	"Something Comforting"		4:42
12.	"Blossom"		3:46
13.	"Unfold" (with TEED)	Robinson; Orlando Higginbottom	4:46
14.	"Trying to Feel Alive"		4:40
Total length:			59:01

Japanese edition bonus track
No.	Title	Writer(s)	Length
15.	"Fullmoon Lullaby" (with Wednesday Campanella)	Robinson; Misaki Koshi; Hidefumi Kenmochi	4:03
Total length:			63:04

=== Notes ===
- All tracks recorded at In-Da-Mix Studios in Montreal, Canada.
- "Look at the Sky", "Get Your Wish" and "Something Comforting" were mastered by Zino Mikorey. "Lifelike", "Wind Tempos", "Musician", "Do-re-mi-fa-so-la-ti-do", "Mother", "Dullscythe", "Sweet Time", "Mirror", "Blossom", "Unfold" and "Trying to Feel Alive" were mastered by Randy Merrill.
- "Look at the Sky" features guitar from Yvette Young.
- "Wind Tempos" has additional recordings from Masakatsu Takagi.
- "Musician" contains samples of "Think (About It)", performed by Lyn Collins, written by James Brown; as well as a currently unreleased collaborative track between Kero Kero Bonito and Robinson.

== Charts ==
Chart performances
Chart (2021)	Peak position
Australian Albums (ARIA)	27
Canadian Albums (Billboard)	57
Japanese Albums (Oricon)	74
Japanese Hot Albums (Billboard Japan)	50
UK Dance Albums (Official Charts)	5
US Billboard 200	52
US Independent Albums (Billboard)	6
US Top Dance Albums (Billboard)	1
