= Virtual Self (EP) =

2017 EP by Porter Robinson as Virtual Self

EP by Virtual Self
- Released: November 29, 2017
- Genres: Trance; neotrance
- Length: 20:33
- Label: Self-released
- Producer: Porter Robinson

Singles from Virtual Self
- 1. "Eon Break" Released: October 25, 2017; 2. "Ghost Voices" Released: November 8, 2017

Virtual Self is the only extended play (EP) by Virtual Self, a side project by the American electronic music producer Porter Robinson. It was self-released on November 29, 2017. After releasing his debut studio album Worlds (2014), a deviation from his earlier, aggressive sound, Robinson struggled to create a follow-up; he underwent a period of writer's block that was intensified by depression. He then started planning the Virtual Self alias, using electronic music and Internet webpages from the early 2000s as his main sources of inspiration. (Note: Robinson has cited 1998–2003, 1999–2003, or the early 2000s as the periods of inspiration for Virtual Self. For simplicity and consistency, "early 2000s" will be used, as it is the most mentioned by Robinson in interviews.)

Virtual Self is a trance and neotrance EP on which Robinson tried to recreate sounds from the early 2000s while incorporating modern song structures. The EP contains mid-tempo songs—represented by the character Pathselector—and faster ones—represented by the character Technic-Angel. The Virtual Self alias presents cryptic messages and a mysterious atmosphere for its visuals.

Two singles were released ahead of the EP: "Eon Break" and "Ghost Voices"; the latter was nominated for a Grammy Award for Best Dance Recording at the 61st Annual Grammy Awards in 2019. Robinson toured as Virtual Self in support of the EP beginning in December 2017, and later in 2018 during his Utopia System tour. The EP sold a thousand copies in its first week of release in the United States and charted on Billboard's Dance/Electronic Album Sales and Heatseekers Albums.

== Background ==
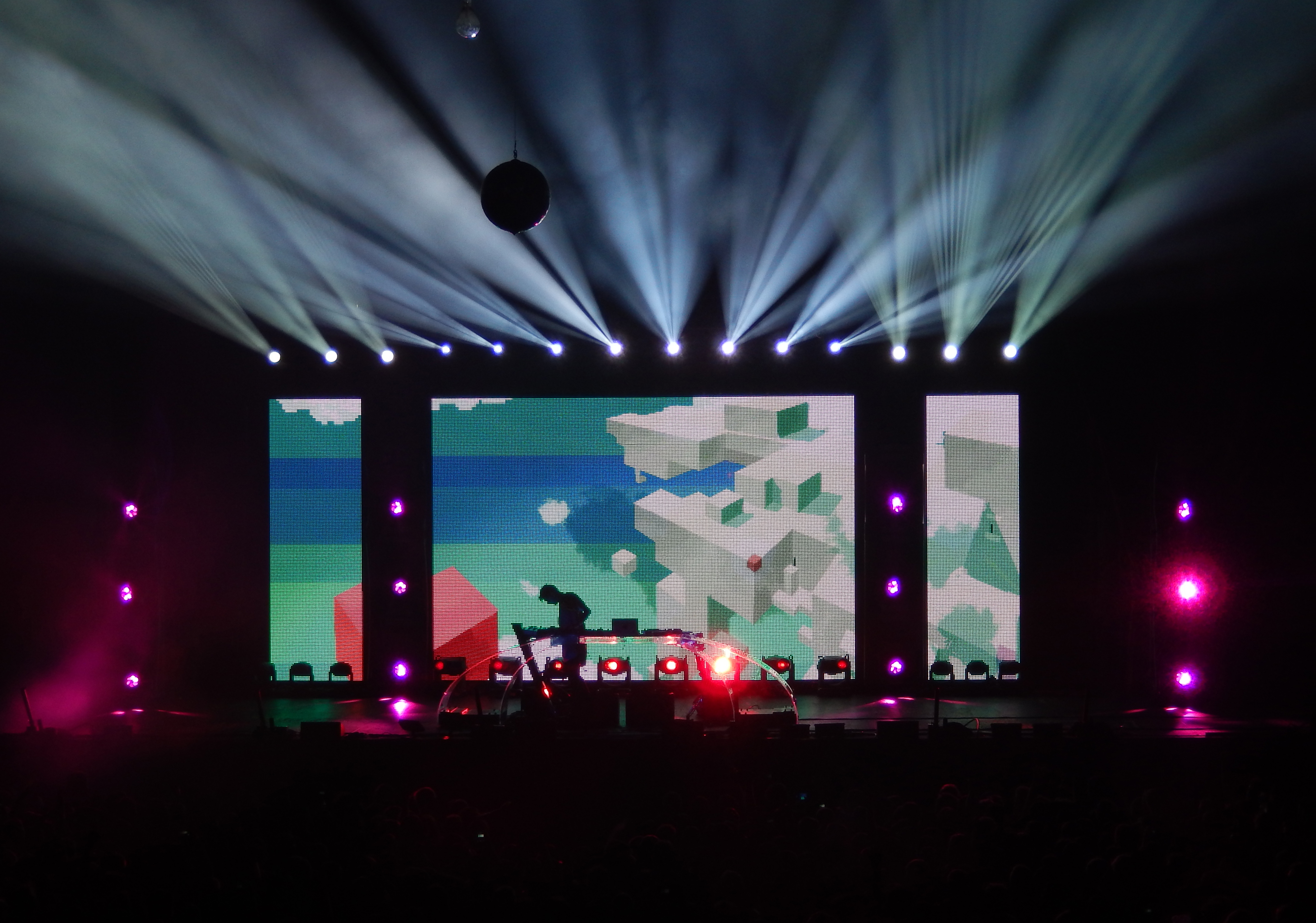
Robinson performing in 2014 on the Worlds Live tour

Porter Robinson was initially known for his aggressive electro and complextro sound, with releases such as the 2010 single "Say My Name" and the 2011 extended play (EP) Spitfire. In 2012, he debuted "Language", his first song with a more melodic sound. Two years later, Robinson released his debut studio album, Worlds, a further departure from his earlier sound. It was acclaimed by critics, with journalists writing that it had an impact on the electronic dance music scene.

Following the launch of Worlds and its positive reception, Robinson set high expectations for himself. Initially, he thought he could continue producing the sounds of that album and felt pressured to release a similar follow-up. He locked himself in his studio for about 12 hours a day and produced a hundred demos for what would be a sequel to Worlds; he described these demos as "the music of a person who was depressed and uninspired and scared and unhappy". Robinson ultimately discarded them, as he could not come up with new ideas or create anything he was satisfied with. Robinson attributed these struggles to depression and self-doubt.

After these attempts, Robinson realized that musical tropes from the early 2000s, albeit not common anymore, were still interesting to him. He was also tempted to write music using a pseudonym, as that made him feel less pressure. Later in 2015, Robinson started planning the Virtual Self alias. In August 2016, he released "Shelter", a collaboration with Madeon that Robinson believed to be successful. He admired Madeon's output of the period and drew inspiration from it, while also seeking to distort that influence into something unrecognizable. The next year, Robinson moved to London to work on the Virtual Self alias.

== Concept and inspiration ==
Dance Dance Revolution (logo) was Robinson's first contact with electronic music.

Robinson's main inspiration for the Virtual Self alias, including its sound and visuals, was the early 2000s. This was the period where Robinson discovered the Dance Dance Revolution (DDR) and Beatmania rhythm games, where he first heard electronic music; DDR was what motivated Robinson to produce music in the first place. The Virtual Self alias has deep roots in nostalgia, and Robinson wanted to help define how people remembered the early 2000s.

Robinson felt reinvigorated from working on Virtual Self. He became highly fixated on the EP and devoted large quantities of time to making it; his passion supplanted his feeling that he should focus on projects with commercial potential, which he believed Virtual Self did not have. In particular, he became "obsessed" with the general feel of the early 2000s present in The Matrix (1999), DeviantArt visuals, forum signatures, and rhythm game backgrounds. Robinson wanted to combine the idea of "cyber, sensibility, technology" from that time—which he felt was associated with the "Eastern European vibe" given by grunge, Linkin Park, and t.A.T.u.—with "the sense of magic", which he related to the Final Fantasy franchise and the video game Phantasy Star Online (2000). With the help of The Wayback Machine, Robinson spent three years revisiting forums and websites he frequented in that period, which helped him compose a mood board for Virtual Self's sounds and visuals. However, Robinson said that Virtual Self was "not purely an homage", as he was not trying to recreate a specific concept, but rather his memories and feelings surrounding the era.

Robinson described the music under his name as his most "authentic and sincere soul", while, according to Billboard, Virtual Self was about "shattering his own habits, perhaps even his image". He said that Virtual Self could be seen as an alienation attempt. Robinson wanted his fans to reject the project, as "[t]hat's a sign of success". He also stated that he wanted to separate music made under his own name from that which was made under the Virtual Self alias; he does not play both in the same shows.

=== Visuals ===
According to Robinson, one of the first things he did for the Virtual Self alias was gather much imagery that evoked a "feeling of Virtual Self", which served as a basis for the album cover's appearance. He also wanted to gather dynamic graphics with a similar style to reference when working with video artists. Ultimately, the intros for the Beatmania IIDX video game series, in particular 6th Style (2001) and 7th Style (2002), were directly referenced in the video artists' work. Robinson also cited the 1998 anime Serial Experiments Lain as one of Virtual Self's biggest influences.

Virtual Self's music videos and website contain cryptic messages and questions. Robinson stated that he did not want to convey specific meaning for these; he said Virtual Self is about creating a mysterious atmosphere. He described the Virtual Self's methodology, especially its visuals, as "chaotic". His techniques to obtain these messages included translating sentences many times through Google Translate; he became inspired by the grammar changes and added words, as well as Markov chains. Robinson also cited influences from a design trope in digital abstract art of the year 2000 "where people would put tiny text everywhere—little floating sentences that are partially blurry and transparent. You feel like they're being whispered to you by a robot." These sentences were just "atmospheric" instead of conveying a specific meaning. Some of these "nonsensical sentences" were taken from arcade game boxes Robinson used to read in the early 2000s.

== Composition ==
Media outlets described the sound of Virtual Self as trance or neotrance. They identified inspirations from early 2000s genres such as speedcore, trance, jungle, rave, and hard trance. (Note: Other less mentioned influences include Eurodance, house, progressive house, intelligent dance music, hardcore, J-core, breakbeat, garage, and electro.) Sources noted similarities to rhythm game music, such as Dance Dance Revolution music, and keygen music.

Robinson wanted to blend different styles of electronic music from the early 2000s, such as jungle, trance and gabber. According to Robinson, he listened to "every" song from 1998 to 2003—a number he claimed to approach 100,000—tagged as trance, jungle, drum and bass, breaks, and techno on Beatport. While he found many of them to be generic and unimpressive, he identified common sonic and structural traits that he could incorporate. Robinson had to research how to authentically recreate sounds from PC Music's "hyper-modern, complex productions", by looking into early 2000s sample packs. However, he also stated that he did not want Virtual Self to be exclusively made of references; he tried to include compositional turns that would not be expected in the genres and time period to which he was paying homage. As such, while still using mostly early 2000s sounds, Robinson also tried to implement modern song structures, stating that he wanted to "morph 2001 tropes into a 2017 production sensibility". Robinson also particularly cited Calvin Harris's 2009 song "I'm Not Alone" as a heavy inspiration for Virtual Self.

=== Songs ===
"Ghost Voices"
"Ghost Voices", a song by Pathselector, includes elements of trance and deep house.

"Eon Break"
"Eon Break", a song by Technic-Angel, includes elements of happy-hardcore and hardstyle.

The Virtual Self alias is represented by two characters created by Robinson, Pathselector and Technic-Angel; to establish them as characters, Robinson created a Twitter account for each. In the EP, the white-dressed, gold-masked Pathselector represents the tracks "Ghost Voices" and "A.I.ngel (Become God)", while Technic-Angel is a fair-skinned, dark-cloaked harbinger that represents the tracks "Particle Arts", "Key", and "Eon Break". Robinson described Pathselector's songs as neotrance, mid-tempo, and adhering stylistically to trance, while he described Technic-Angel's songs as "maximalist, 170 BPM, crazy hardcore, speedcore, jungle, and drum and bass".

The EP begins with the Technic-Angel track "Particle Arts", which Philip Sherburne of Pitchfork described as "a 175-BPM juggernaut of trance stabs and happy-hardcore breaks". According to Andrew Rafter of DJ Mag, Robinson uses EDM-styled drum and bass with glitch elements. The next track is Pathselector's "Ghost Voices", which combines deep house and trance elements while, according to Kat Bein of Billboard, having "soulful, halftime garage vibes". Sherburne described it as the most contemporary sounding track of the EP. It is followed by "A.I.ngel (Become God)", also by Pathselector, which combines trance and big beat elements. Sherburne said that it contains "carefully sculpted vocal synths" similar to the ones found in Garden of Delete (2015) by Oneohtrix Point Never. The last two tracks, "Key" and "Eon Break", are by Technic-Angel. The EDM-like track "Key" changes its key halfway through, a common pop music trope. The trance-like "Eon Break" ends the EP with "a break-neck, glittering, happy-hardcore tune", according to Bein, while Sherburne felt it "deals in hardstyle cadences and machine-gun snares".

== Promotion and release ==
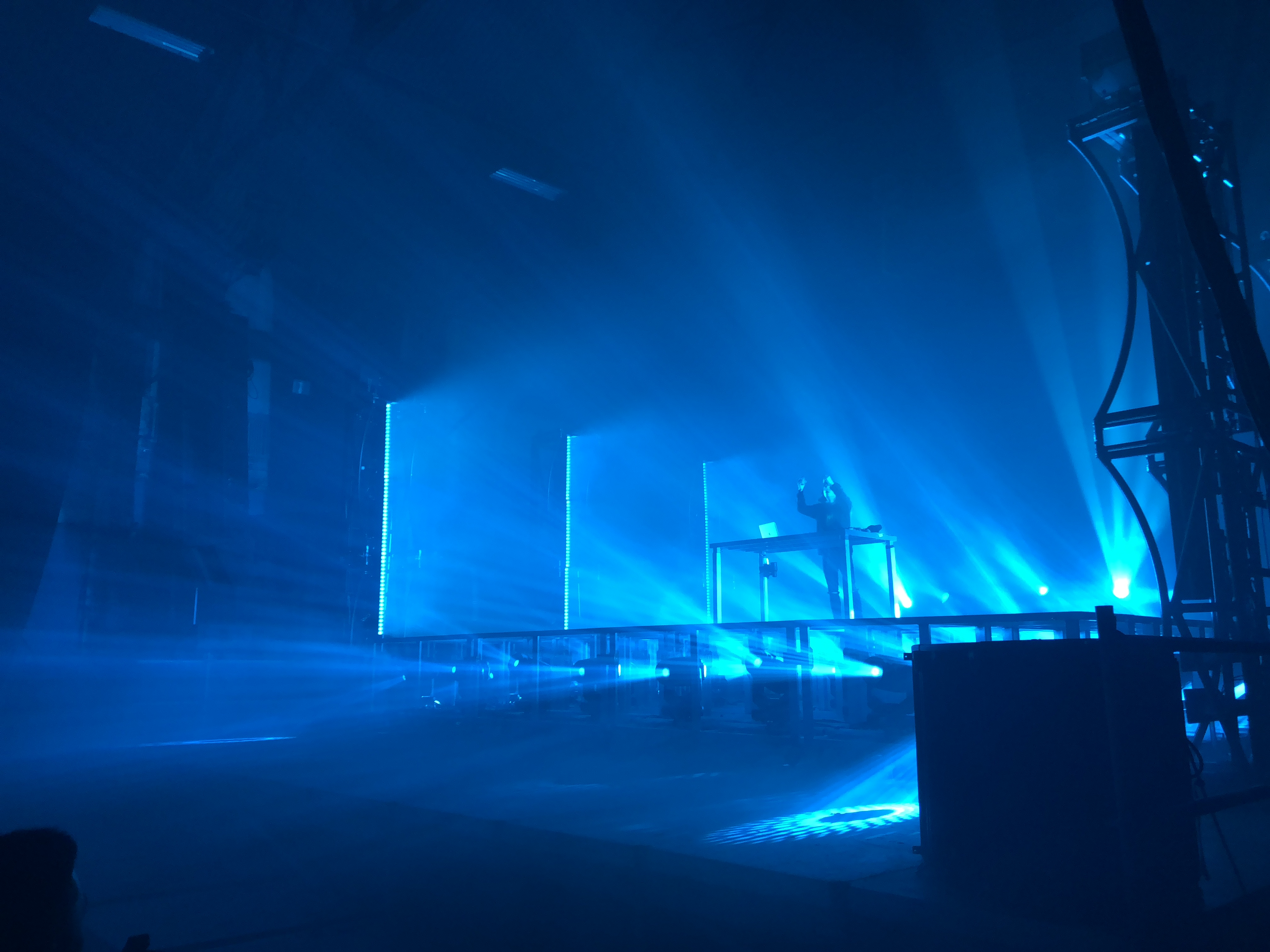
Robinson performing as Virtual Self in Brooklyn, New York, on December 8, 2017

On October 25, 2017, Robinson released the EP's first single, "Eon Break", announcing his then-new alias Virtual Self via his Twitter page. A music video for the song was released, containing cryptic messages. The EP's second single, "Ghost Voices", was released on November 8, 2017. On November 18, Robinson announced the Virtual Self EP, making previews of its tracks available on a new website announced on Virtual Self's Twitter page.

The EP was released on November 29, 2017. In the United States, Virtual Self sold 1,000 copies in its first week of release and appeared in two Billboard charts, peaking at number eight on Dance/Electronic Album Sales and number 21 on Heatseekers Albums. Robinson first performed as Virtual Self on December 8, 2017, in Brooklyn, New York. Shows continued in 2018, with Robinson playing in U.S. festivals such as the Ultra Music Festival in Miami. On January 11 that year, a music video for "Particle Arts" was released, alongside one for "Ghost Voices" on February 28 and one for "Key" on April 18. Robinson released "Angel Voices" on July 20, 2018, a happy-hardcore infused remix of "Ghost Voices" which he described as the "Technic-Angel remix". He toured as Virtual Self from August 31 to October 4 on the North American Utopia System Tour. In 2020, Robinson announced a Virtual Self artbook and fashion line in collaboration with the Japanese brand Chloma.

== Reception and legacy ==
Professional ratings
Review scores
Source	Rating
Pitchfork	5.9/10

Kat Bein of Billboard described the Virtual Self alias as "high concept musical nerdiness" with a strong Final Fantasy influence and that the entire EP "plays like a killer soundtrack to the best mid-2000s RPG Nintendo forgot to release". Philip Sherburne of Pitchfork described Virtual Self as an effort to evoke the aesthetics of the turn of the millennium whose rhythms are "funkless" and "hyperactive", reminiscent of Dance Dance Revolution soundtracks. He said that Virtual Self focuses on the fanciest aspects of Robinson's influences, eliminating any chance of subtlety "beneath a billion-watt gleam". Sherburne finished his review by saying that Virtual Self's revamp on trance meant "the boundaries of taste are always in flux" and that, in the end, "nostalgia will rehabilitate even the shaggiest underdogs." Andrew Rafter of DJ Mag praised Robinson for experimenting with new influences and sounds, but lamented that some of the tracks didn't fully meet his expectations.

Billboard staff ranked "Ghost Voices" as the 32nd best dance/electronic song of 2017. In an interview with the same magazine published in February 2018, DJ Calvin Harris stated that "Ghost Voices" made him enjoy dance music again. The Fader staff named Virtual Self an "artist you need to know about" in 2018, and chose the EP track "Particle Arts" as the 63rd best track of that year. "Ghost Voices" was nominated for a Grammy Award for Best Dance Recording at the 61st Annual Grammy Awards, marking Robinson's first ever nomination to the award. In a statement to Billboard in January 2019, Robinson said he had not even realized "Ghost Voices" had been submitted for consideration; being nominated made him feel like he won. Billboard staff named it the 18th greatest dance song of the decade. Robinson perceived that hardstyle and hardcore surged in popularity after the EP was released.

== Track listing ==
All music is composed by Porter Robinson.

Virtual Self track listing
No.	Title	Length
1.	"Particle Arts"	3:54
2.	"Ghost Voices"	4:26
3.	"A.I.ngel (Become God)"	5:01
4.	"Key"	3:32
5.	"Eon Break"	3:40
Total length:		20:33

== Chart performance ==
Chart performance for Virtual Self
Chart (2017)	Peak position
US Dance/Electronic Album Sales (Billboard)	8
US Heatseekers Albums (Billboard)	21
