= Mirror (Porter Robinson song) =

2020 single by Porter Robinson

Single by Porter Robinson

from the album Nurture
- Released: August 26, 2020
- Recorded: April 6, 2019 – March 23, 2020
- Genre: Electro-pop
- Length: 5:07
- Label: Mom + Pop
- Songwriter: Porter Robinson
- Producer: Porter Robinson

Porter Robinson singles chronology
| "Something Comforting" (2020) | "Mirror" (2020) | "Look at the Sky" (2021) |

Music video
- "Mirror" on YouTube

"Mirror" is a song by American record producer Porter Robinson. It was released on August 26, 2020, as the third single from his second studio album Nurture (2021), by Mom + Pop. The song addresses themes of shame and self-criticism, and Robinson viewed it as a means to overcome his fears of external disapproval. "Mirror" was released to a generally positive reception, and an associated music video was released on September 9, 2020.

== Background and composition ==
"Mirror" is a song about the costs of being hard on yourself. We all have these avatars that we give to our critical inner voices ... it's about recognizing that most of this criticism is self-inflicted. For years, I was imagining the worst thing a critic might say about my music and looking at my own work as negatively as possible as a way to protect myself from criticism, but it never once served me.

— Porter Robinson

Following the release of his previous album Worlds (2014), Robinson had set high expectations for himself, saying in 2018 that he felt he was "under a lot of pressure to do something akin to a follow-up". However, in the years following the album's release, this led to an extended period of depression and writer's block during which he released very little music. According to Robinson, Nurture (2021) was a way of "finding the beauty in everyday and reality as it is".

American Songwriter's Joe Vitagliano felt that "Mirror" addresses elements of Robinson's "shame and fear". Robinson viewed the song a means to overcome his fears and create music without considering external disapproval, saying "So many of the painful experiences I was having with criticism or rejection or failure were imagined." According to AllMusic's Paul Simpson, the song also depicts Robinson "searching inward for validation". The song's ending, featuring the lines "Sometimes, the inner voice is encouraging ... it will all be okay in the end", samples a video from psychotherapy company The School of Life. NME's Ben Jolley felt that the quote was the most reflective of the themes of the album as well as "[Robinson]'s journey as an artist".

== Release and reception ==
"Mirror"
American Songwriter's Joe Vitagliano noted the contrast between the lyrics and the production, calling it a "sonic atmosphere of solace".

"Mirror" was released on August 26, 2020, to a generally positive critical reception. Several reviewers praised the song's production; PopMatters's Chris Conaton said that it has a "strong piano element", but switches to an electronic beat with percussive "digital clicks and pops". Paper's Matt Moen described the style as "lo-fi electro-pop". Contrasting it with the themes presented in the lyrics, DeVille described the song as a "wall of gorgeous sound". Vitagliano also noted this pairing, calling it a "sonic atmosphere of solace". Slant's Charles Lyons-Burt felt that each motif is periodically "dismantled and put back together" into a different one, preventing the song from becoming overly repetitive. Our Culture's Konstantinos Pappis found the song "irresistibly catchy and strikingly intimate" and felt that the songwriting also reflected on the "imaginative spirit" of Worlds. However, The Line of Best Fit's Sophie Walker felt that the song was "impressive in isolation", but became lost in the context of Nurture as a whole.

The music video for "Mirror" was released on September 9, 2020. Directed by Robinson, it depicts an avatar of him guiding the viewer through the woods, which feature animated flowers and trees.

== Charts ==
| Chart (2020) | Peak position |
|---|---|
| US Hot Dance/Electronic Songs (Billboard) | 32 |
