= Everything Goes On =

Single by Porter Robinson
- Released: July 14, 2022
- Genre: Pop; indie rock; indie electronic; liquid drum and bass
- Length: 3:22
- Label: Riot Games
- Songwriters: Brendon Williams; Fredrik Johansson; Hige Driver; Porter Robinson
- Producers: Porter Robinson; Brendon Williams

Porter Robinson singles chronology
"Unfold" (2021)	"Everything Goes On" (2022)	"Circle Game (ANOHANA Ver.)" (2023)

Music video
- "Everything Goes On" on YouTube

"Everything Goes On" is a single by American electronic music producer Porter Robinson, released in collaboration with video game League of Legends on July 14, 2022. It was Robinson's first release since his album Nurture (2021).

The song is tied to the Star Guardian 2022 event in League of Legends, a tribute to the magical girl genre of anime. The song's lyrics draw inspiration from the magical girl anime Madoka Magica.

== Background and composition ==
Somebody who I really love was going through something really painful, and I started writing about that, and that was when it really clicked for me because I wasn't faking anything anymore. The emotions I was writing about were really sincerely held and painful. And when I finally figured out the second pre-chorus, I literally cried in the studio. My entire heart was in it.

— Robinson to The Verge on writing the lyrics to "Everything Goes On"

During the COVID-19 pandemic, Robinson's wife Rika (then his girlfriend) introduced him to League of Legends. When League of Legends developer Riot Games released the animated series Arcane, Robinson realized he wanted to be involved in one of their projects. He then decided to approach Riot about contributing a song; they proposed he work on the Star Guardian 2022 theme, to be accompanied by an animation of about two-and-a-half minutes in length.

Robinson frequently redid the lyrics to "Everything Goes On" while working on it, something he attributed to his growing focus on lyrics in the songwriting process. Initially drawing inspiration from an animated short released by Riot in 2019, Robinson eventually shifted towards writing about something closer to his own experiences about a loved one "going through something really painful". Because of the personal nature of the lyrics, Robinson felt like it was necessary to use his natural voice, as opposed to the heavy vocal processing featured on tracks from Nurture.

In addition to the electronic elements present in his previous work, "Everything Goes On" draws from elements of indie rock and was partially performed by Robinson on the guitar, which he described as a "different workflow" for himself.

== Music video ==
"Everything Goes On" was released alongside an official music video to start off the Star Guardian 2022 event in League of Legends. Robinson did not work on the animated video which, according to The Verge writer Andrew Webster, "created an interesting contrast" at times due to the personal nature of the song and its lyrics.

== Critical reception ==
Writing for Billboard, Kat Bein describes "Everything Goes On" as a "heartfelt sing-along", writing that it "captures all the beauty, power and sadness that comes with sacrificing your life as a teenage girl to protect the world; and it does it all without sacrificing any part of its Porter Robinson-ness."

In an article for NME, Ali Shutler describes "Everything Goes On" as "a beautiful song that wrestles with melancholy, hope, love, desire and loss."

== Track listing ==
"Everything Goes On" – Digital single
No.	Title	Length
1.	"Everything Goes On"	3:22
Total length:		3:22

"Everything Goes On" – 7-inch single
No.	Title	Length
1.	"Everything Goes On"	3:22
2.	"Everything Goes On" (Star Guardian Version)	2:30
Total length:		5:52

== Charts ==
Chart performance for "Everything Goes On"
Chart (2022)	Peak position
New Zealand Hot Singles (RMNZ)	10
US Hot Dance/Electronic Songs (Billboard)	9
Vietnam (Vietnam Hot 100)	90
