= Something Comforting =

2020 single performed by Porter Robinson

Single by Porter Robinson

from the album Nurture
- Released: March 10, 2020
- Recorded: June 14, 2015 – August 8, 2019
- Genre: Electro-pop; drum and bass
- Length: 4:42 (album version); 4:29 (video version)
- Label: Mom + Pop
- Songwriter: Porter Robinson
- Producer: Porter Robinson

Porter Robinson singles chronology
"Get Your Wish" (2020)	"Something Comforting" (2020)	"Mirror" (2020)

Music video
- "Something Comforting" on YouTube

"Something Comforting" is a song recorded by American electronic music producer Porter Robinson. Released on March 10, 2020 as the second single from his second studio album Nurture, the song was written and produced by Robinson himself. Robinson also provided the vocals for the track. The song is representative of Robinson's struggles with creative blocks and depression.

"Something Comforting" is featured as a playable song in the arcade game Dance Dance Revolution A3.

== Composition ==
"I went through a pretty intense creative struggle and depression in the years like 2015, 2016...but it was during that time that I wrote this section of 'Something Comforting'...and that was the very first thing that I knew I was going to keep. And I've probably listened to it, like, ten thousand times, maybe more."

— Robinson in a video to fans

Some time after the release of his Worlds album, Robinson had a creative struggle and went through a depressive episode which lasted for a few years. During this period, Robinson began working on songs from Nurture, including "Something Comforting". He started the song by writing the instrumental hook, which he got attached to and listened to repeatedly. This beginning marked the start of his work on the Nurture album. However, he didn't finish writing the lyrics until 2019, when he had already written ten other songs.

The song features Robinson's natural voice, along with a version of his own voice that is modified to be higher and more feminine. The song switches between the two voices, notably at the end, where the voice used frequently alternates. The lyrics are about his feelings from 2015.

== Release ==
Robinson stated that he initially wanted "Something Comforting" to be the first track from Nurture to be released, though "Get Your Wish" ultimately became the first release. "Something Comforting" was released on March 10, 2020.

Nine days after the release of "Something Comforting", the site nurtu.re was launched, featuring virtual playgrounds for the Nurture singles.

== Music video ==
On March 25, 2020, fifteen days after the single was first released, the music video for "Something Comforting" was released.

Similar to the video for "Get Your Wish", the video features Robinson and is set on a platform with a flat background. The platform has a forest theme, with features such as grass and rocks. Throughout the video, he can be seen performing certain actions, such as planting seeds. At the climax, Robinson can be seen stepping off the platform, which results in him floating in the air. In an interview with Peter Robinson from Popjustice, Porter Robinson stated that the video is meant to represent the struggle of being stuck in his studio, and the darkness surrounding the platform represents "the uncertainty of life outside your routines."

== Critical reception ==
Ben Jolley of NME described "Something Comforting" and "Look at the Sky" as "two of the most uplifting yet tear-jerking songs you're likely to hear [in 2021]." In a review of Nurture for Slant, Charles Lyons-Burt described the song as having "ricocheting drum n' bass" and wrote that songs such as "Something Comforting" and "Mirror" "add a glitchy dynamism to potentially overwrought inspirational songs [on Nurture]." "Something Comforting" and "Get Your Wish" were described as "euphoric pop songs" by Pitchfork's Colin Joyce. In an article for Paper, Matt Meon described "Something Comforting" as "[Nurture]'s soaring climax."

== Personnel ==
Credits adapted from Tidal.

- Porter Robinson – producer, composer, lyricist, mixer
- Zino Mikorey – engineer
- Tom Norris – mixer

== Charts ==
Chart (2020)	Peak position
US Hot Dance/Electronic Songs (Billboard)	12

== Release history ==
Version	Region	Date	Format(s)	Label
Original	Various	March 10, 2020	Digital download; streaming	Mom + Pop
Music video	Various	March 25, 2020	Streaming	Mom + Pop
