= Look at the Sky =

2021 single by Porter Robinson

Single by Porter Robinson

from the album Nurture
- Released: January 27, 2021
- Recorded: March 31, 2016–February 11, 2020
- Genre: Synth-pop
- Length: 5:10
- Label: Mom + Pop
- Songwriter: Porter Robinson
- Producer: Porter Robinson

Porter Robinson singles chronology
"Mirror" (2020)	"Look at the Sky" (2021)	"Musician" (2021)

Music video
- "Look at the Sky" on YouTube

Alternative cover

"Look at the Sky" is a song by American electronic music producer Porter Robinson. It was released on January 27, 2021, as the fourth single from his second studio album Nurture. The song is featured in the soundtrack of the video game Forza Horizon 5, on the Horizon Pulse radio station. It is also featured as a playable song in the arcade game Dance Dance Revolution A3, as well as the online Battle Royale video game Fortnite as a lobby music track in collaboration with Coachella 2023.

== Background and composition ==
"'Look at the Sky' is fundamentally a song about hope. There's no shortage of fuel for despair, but you can't take meaningful action to improve things if you don't have some belief that things might get better. That's what hope is, and I think it's an emotion worth nourishing. I wrote this song at my lowest point emotionally, when I thought I couldn't make music anymore, and I wasn't sure if my existence would have any meaning if I couldn't make music."

— A statement from Robinson regarding "Look at the Sky"

In 2017, after having not left his studio for some time, Robinson left for Japan with his girlfriend. There, he "started forcing [himself] to do new things and forcing [himself] to spend time not working" and wrote the chorus of "Look at the Sky" there. Later that year, he tweeted "I can make something good." This turned out to be a line from the then-unreleased song.

After the release of the singles "Get Your Wish" and "Something Comforting" in early 2020, the rollout of Nurture was postponed due to the COVID-19 pandemic. In addition, Robinson's "Second Sky" music festival was cancelled and replaced with a virtual festival named "Secret Sky," which took place on May 9, 2020. Robinson closed his Secret Sky performance with a teaser of "Look at the Sky." The single's official release was announced by Robinson on January 13, 2021.

The song is in the key of F-sharp major, with a BPM of 115.

== Music video ==
A music video was released on February 10, 2021, and was directed by Chris Muir and choreographed by Matty Peacock. Robinson has stated that the music video is about how his work could not be where it is now if not for the contributions of those before him. In the music video, Robinson performs alongside ghosts that stay by his side, before turning into one himself by the end.

== Critical reception ==
In a review of the song for The Harvard Crimson, Arik Katz wrote that "Robinson’s refusal to shy away from writing about his experiences with depression and self-doubt lends power to his gorgeous lyricism," but also remarked that "'Look at the Sky' is not without flaws. The instrumental hook feels cliché in its sugary expression of positivity." In an 8/10 review of Nurture for Clash, Josh Crowe described the song as "the standout cut from the album." Ben Devlin, in a 4 out of 5 star review of Nurture for musicOMH, wrote that "The melodies are effortless ear-candy, while the vocals exude a stoic optimism." Also in a 4 star review, Ben Jolley, writing for NME, described "Look at the Sky" and "Something Comforting" as "two of the most uplifting yet tear-jerking songs you're likely to hear this year."

=== Year-end lists ===
"Look at the Sky" was ranked at seventy-second place on Billboard's list of the best 2021 songs, seventeenth on The Fader's list, and fifth on Our Culture Mag's list.

== Personnel ==
Credits adapted from Tidal.

- Porter Robinson – producer, composer, lyricist, mixer
- Zino Mikorey – engineer
- Tom Norris – mixer
- Yvette Young – guitar (uncredited)

== Charts ==
=== Weekly charts ===
Weekly chart performance for "Look at the Sky"
Chart (2021)	Peak position
US Hot Dance/Electronic Songs (Billboard)	12
US Rock & Alternative Airplay (Billboard)	43

=== Year-end charts ===
Year-end chart performance for "Look at the Sky"
Chart (2021)	Position
US Hot Dance/Electronic Songs (Billboard)	70
