= Quest for Fire (album) =

Studio album by Skrillex
- Released: February 17, 2023
- Genres: Dubstep; dance-pop; house; 2-step garage; Chicago juke
- Length: 45:03
- Labels: Owsla; Atlantic
- Producers: Skrillex; Joyryde; Jamie xx; Mr. Oizo; Four Tet; Fred Again; Joker; Sleepnet; Posij; Peekaboo; Noisia; josh pan; Dylan Brady; Porter Robinson

Skrillex chronology
Show Tracks (2019)	Quest for Fire (2023)	Don't Get Too Close (2023)

Singles from Quest for Fire
- 1. "Butterflies" Released: May 10, 2021; 2. "Too Bizarre" Released: May 13, 2021; 3. "Supersonic (My Existence)" Released: June 10, 2021; 4. "Rumble" Released: January 4, 2023; 5. "Leave Me Like This" Released: January 18, 2023; 6. "Xena" Released: February 2, 2023

Quest for Fire is the second studio album by American record producer Skrillex, released on February 17, 2023, through Owsla and Atlantic Records. It follows his 2014 album Recess and was preceded by the singles "Rumble" (with Fred Again and Flowdan), "Leave Me Like This" (with Bobby Raps), and "Xena" (with Nai Barghouti). It also includes collaborations with Aluna, Eli Keszler, Starrah, Swae Lee, Noisia, Dylan Brady, Four Tet, Missy Elliott, Mr. Oizo, Porter Robinson and Bibi Bourelly. The album is composed of house, dubstep, two-step garage and Chicago juke songs.

Skrillex released his third album, Don't Get Too Close, on February 18, a day after Quest for Fire.

== Promotion ==
The album was first teased when Skrillex uploaded a teaser video titled "QFF/DGTC 23" across his social media on January 1, 2023. Following the release of three singles across January and early February, Skrillex announced the album on February 11, 2023, also uploading a DJ set of modified tracks from the album filmed in his basement on his YouTube channel the same day. The album was released while Skrillex was performing at Le Poisson Rouge during one of several pop-up shows across New York City in the days leading up to his show at Madison Square Garden with Fred Again.. and Four Tet.

=== Singles ===
Along with including the announced lead single "Rumble" (with Fred Again and Flowdan), as well as the subsequent 2023 singles "Leave Me Like This" (with Bobby Raps) and "Xena" (with Nai Barghouti), the track list features Skrillex's 2021 singles "Butterflies" (with Starrah and Four Tet), a remix of "Too Bizarre" (with Swae Lee and Siiickbrain) and "Supersonic (My Existence)" (with Noisia, josh pan and Dylan Brady). "Ratata" featuring Missy Elliott and Mr. Oizo is set to be released as a single; it includes an interpolation of Elliott's 2002 song "Work It".

== Critical reception ==
Professional ratings
Aggregate scores
Source	Rating
Metacritic	72/100
Review scores
Source	Rating
AllMusic	3.5/5 stars
The Arts Desk	4/5 stars
Clash	8/10
The Guardian	3/5 stars
The Line of Best Fit	8/10
NME	3/5 stars
Pitchfork	7.7/10
Sputnikmusic	3.2/5
The Telegraph	4/5 stars
Tom Hull	B+

According to the review aggregator Metacritic, Quest for Fire received "generally favorable reviews" based on a weighted average score of 72 out of 100 from 12 critic scores. Joe Muggs of The Arts Desk called the album "the most groove-based thing [Skrillex has] done" and "hyper-detailed, a sci-fi-psychedelic jungle of micro sounds and macro mutations", finding that "it successfully holds together crazed disparate elements". Writing for NME, Ben Jolley opined that Quest for Fire contains "bountiful genres" and that Skrillex's "return largely lives up to the hype" by "often channel[ing] nostalgia", but also after "covering so much ground" in terms of the genres and sounds explored, this "means the album lacks a clear narrative or overarching theme". The staff review from AllMusic claimed, "The tracks on Quest for Fire go for instant dancefloor gratification, but they're far more refined and nuanced than the brostep ragers that made Skrillex a household name in the early 2010s."

Alexis Petridis of The Guardian wrote that the album is "guest-laden eclecticism that walks the line between catchy and annoying" and includes "a bit of everything, from house and dubstep to two-step garage and Chicago juke", concluding that it "feels more like a crammed mood-board than an album". Isabel Armitage of Clash commented "we still get to hear the classic EDM sound palette in Quest For Fire as well as high tuned pop punk vocals that we have come to expect from Skrillex" on the album, concluding that it "features an eclectic mix sub cultures from niche areas of the world, with each song fluidly merging with the next whilst creating a new, unique sound". Writing for Pitchfork, Chal Ravens felt Quest for Fire "is a huge evolution from the brash, stadium-sized ragers of Skrillex 1.0. He's finally absorbed the fundamentals of dance music: basic stuff, like having a rhythm that makes you want to move your body."

Reviewing the album for The Telegraph, Ali Shutler expressed relief that Quest for Fire "doesn't sound like 2010 all over again", but that it "still blends urgent, bass-heavy peaks and drops with a near-constant sense of euphoria". Shutler described it as "still visceral EDM designed to get the pulse racing, but the whole thing has been given an ambitious refresh", calling it the "second coming of Skrillex". Writing for Sputnikmusic, Kirk Bowman questioned why Skrillex did not "do more with hyperpop or dariacore producers that clearly idolize him, or cash in on the many stars he's previously worked with who could have written more interesting songs for him", writing that while he "appreciate[s] the effort" that went into making the album "sound diverse and interesting", he could not "help but imagine how much farther [Skrillex] could have gone".

=== Year-end lists ===
Select year-end rankings of Quest for Fire
Critic/Publication	List	Rank	Ref.
Rolling Stone	The 100 Best Albums of 2023	68	
The Line of Best Fit	The Best Albums of 2023	43	

== Track listing ==
Quest for Fire track listing
No.	Title	Writer(s)	Producer(s)	Length
1.	"Leave Me Like This" (with Bobby Raps)	Sonny Moore; Clifford Smith; Corey Woods; Dennis Coles; James Yancey; Jason Hunter; Keith Alexander; Leslie Charles; Robert Richardson	Skrillex; Chris Lake^{[a]}; Joyryde^{[a]}	3:08
2.	"Ratata" (with Missy Elliott and Mr. Oizo)	Moore; Christopher Stein; Darryl McDaniels; Deborah Harry; Joseph Simmons; Melissa Elliott; Paul Simon; Quentin Dupieux	Skrillex; Tom Norris; Joyryde^{[a]}; Ethan Mates^{[d]}	2:06
3.	"Tears" (with Joker and Sleepnet)	Moore; Aion Clarke; Fred Jerkins; Isaac Phillips; LaShawn Daniels; Leroy Watson; Liam McLean; Mario Winans; Michael Carlos Jones; Nik Roos; Nycolia Turman; Rodney Jerkins	Skrillex; Joker; Sleepnet	3:05
4.	"Rumble" (with Fred Again and Flowdan)	Moore; Elley Duhé; Fred Gibson; Jordan Douglas; Marc Veira; Tyshane Thomas	Skrillex; Fred Again	2:26
5.	"Butterflies" (with Starrah and Four Tet)	Moore; Bibi Bourelly; Brittany "Starrah" Hazzard; Kieran Hebden	Skrillex; Four Tet	3:15
6.	"Inhale Exhale" (with Aluna and Kito)	Moore; Jamie Smith; Maaike Kito Lebbing; Aluna Dewji Francis; Noah Lev Beresin; Gregory Aldae Hein	Skrillex; Jamie xx^{[a]}; Joyryde^{[a]}	3:25
7.	"A Street I Know" (with Eli Keszler)	Moore; Eli Keszler; Yann Tiersen	Skrillex; Keszler; Joyryde^{[a]}	3:35
8.	"Xena" (with Nai Barghouti)	Moore; Rasha Mosa	Skrillex	4:11
9.	"Too Bizarre (Juked)" (with Swae Lee, Siiickbrain, and Posij)	Moore; Caroline Miner Smith; Everett Romano; Frank Post; Khalif Brown; Rex Kudo	Skrillex; Heavy Mellow; Posij; Kudo; Siiickbrain^{[d]}	3:28
10.	"Hydrate" (with Flowdan, Beam, and Peekaboo)	Moore; Veira; Thomas; Rogét Chahayed; Matthew Lucas	Skrillex; Peekaboo; Chahayed	3:36
11.	"Warped Tour '05 with Pete Wentz" (with Pete Wentz)	Moore	Skrillex	0:48
12.	"Good Space" (with Starrah)	Moore; Hazzard; Hikaru Utada; Jason Boyd	Skrillex	2:12
13.	"Supersonic (My Existence)" (with Noisia, Josh Pan, and Dylan Brady)	Moore; Roos; Martijn van Sonderen; Thijs de Vlieger; Josh Pan; Dylan Brady	Skrillex; Noisia; Drew Gold^{[b]}	2:45
14.	"Hazel Theme"	Moore; Leven Kali; Porter Robinson; Snoh Sheri Nowrozi	Skrillex	1:51
15.	"Still Here (With the Ones That I Came With)" (with Porter Robinson and Bibi Bourelly)	Moore; Robinson; Bibi Bourelly; Sheri Nowrozi; Kali	Skrillex; Robinson	5:12
Total length:				45:03

Notes

- ^{^[a]} signifies an additional producer
- ^{^[b]} signifies an assistant producer
- ^{^[c]} signifies a vocal producer
- ^{^[d]} signifies an additional remixer
- "Ratata" and "Xena" are stylized in all caps.
- "Too Bizarre (Juked)" is stylized as "TOO BIZARRE (juked)".
- "Warped Tour '05 with Pete Wentz" is stylized as "Warped Tour '05 with pete WENTZ".
- Parenthesized text in "Supersonic (My Existence)" and "Still Here (With the Ones That I Came With)" are stylized in all lowercase.

Sample credits

- "Leave Me Like This" contains a sample of "Caribbean Queen" by Billy Ocean.
- "Ratata" contains a sample of "Positif" by Mr. Oizo.
- "Tears" samples both "I Never Knew" by Deborah Cox and "Hydrate".
- "Rumble" contains a sample of "Selecta" by Skrillex and Beam.
- "Inhale Exhale" contains a sample of "Alone With You" by Kito featuring AlunaGeorge.
- "Xena" contains a sample of "Ghandara" by Nai Barghouti.
- "Still Here (With the Ones That I Came With)" samples both "Time" by Snoh Aalegra, and "Painting Rainbows" by Skrillex and Bibi Bourelly.

== Personnel ==
Musicians

- Skrillex – programming (all tracks), drum programming (1), all instruments (3, 5, 6, 8–14), vocals (14, 15)
- Joyryde – programming (1, 2, 6, 7), all instruments (1, 6)
- Nai Barghouti – additional vocals (1), vocals (8)
- Rachael Nedrow – additional vocals (1)
- Chris Lake – all instruments, programming (1)
- Bobby Raps – vocals (1)
- Carlos Sosa – saxophone (2)
- Missy Elliott – vocals (2)
- Mr. Oizo – vocals (2)
- Beam – additional vocals (3), vocals (4, 10)
- Meats (Salamimeats) – additional vocals (3)
- Joker – all instruments, programming, vocals (3)
- Sleepnet – all instruments, programming (3)
- Tom Norris – programming (3)
- Fred Again – all instruments (4)
- Elley Duhé – vocals (4)
- Flowdan – vocals (4, 10)
- Four Tet – all instruments, programming (5)
- Bibi Bourelly – vocals (5)
- Jamie xx – all instruments, programming (6)
- Aluna – vocals (6)
- Kito – vocals (6)
- Eli Keszler – live drums (7, 13), vocals (7)
- Rasha Mosa – additional vocals (8)
- Heavy Mellow – all instruments, programming (9)
- Posij – all instruments, programming (9)
- Rex Kudo – all instruments, programming (9)
- Swae Lee – vocals (9)
- Peekaboo – all instruments, programming (10)
- Rogét Chahayed – all instruments, programming (10)
- Pete Wentz – vocals (11)
- Starrah – vocals (12)
- Noisia – all instruments, programming (13)
- Dylan Brady – all instruments, programming (13)

Technical

- Skrillex – mixing (1–12, 14), mastering (3, 8–11, 14), engineering (all tracks)
- Joyryde – mixing, mastering (1, 2, 7)
- Joker – mixing, mastering, engineering (3)
- Four Tet – mixing (5)
- Peekaboo – mixing (10)
- ISOxo – mixing, mastering (12)
- Manny Marroquin – mixing (13)
- Luca Pretolesi – mastering (4)
- Mike Bozzi – mastering (5, 13)
- Bernie Grundman – mastering (5)
- Bobby Raps – engineering (1)
- Drew Gold – engineering (1, 2, 4–6, 9–12, 14)
- Sleepnet – engineering (3)
- Fred Gibson – engineering (4)
- Flowdan – engineering (10)

== Charts ==
=== Weekly charts ===
Weekly chart performance for Quest for Fire
Chart (2023)	Peak position
Australian Albums (ARIA)	33
Austrian Albums (Ö3 Austria)	49
Belgian Albums (Ultratop Flanders)	119
Belgian Albums (Ultratop Wallonia)	153
Canadian Albums (Billboard)	29
French Albums (SNEP)	159
Japanese Digital Albums (Oricon)	19
Japanese Hot Albums (Billboard Japan)	83
Lithuanian Albums (AGATA)	58
New Zealand Albums (RMNZ)	8
Spanish Albums (Promusicae)	71
Swiss Albums (Schweizer Hitparade)	57
UK Albums (Official Charts)	78
UK Dance Albums (Official Charts)	2
US Billboard 200	51
US Top Dance Albums (Billboard)	2

=== Year-end charts ===
Year-end chart performance for Quest for Fire
Chart (2023)	Position
US Top Dance/Electronic Albums (Billboard)	25
