= Language (Porter Robinson song) =

Single by Porter Robinson
- Released: April 10, 2012
- Recorded: 2011
- Genre: Electro house; progressive house
- Length: 6:08; 3:19 (UK radio edit)
- Label: Big Beat (US); Ministry of Sound (UK)
- Songwriters: Heather Bright; Porter Robinson
- Producer: Porter Robinson

Porter Robinson singles chronology
"The Wildcat" (2011)	"Language" (2012)	"Easy" (2013)

Heather Bright singles chronology
"Don't Blame the Party (Mode)" (2012)	"Language" (2012)	"We Are the Sun" (2012)

"Language" is a song by American electronic music producer and DJ Porter Robinson. The song was uploaded on YouTube by Porter Robinson on April 1, 2012. The song was released in the United States on Big Beat Records as a digital download on April 10, 2012. The song was later released in the United Kingdom in an EP package from the Ministry of Sound on August 12, 2012. It debuted at number nine on the UK Singles Chart. The song features uncredited vocals from Heather Bright. The song received remixes from producers Kayzo together with Gammer, and from Jauz.

== Background ==
In 2010, Porter Robinson released his first hit, "Say My Name", which topped Beatport's electro house charts. After capturing Skrillex's interest with the track, Robinson signed with Skrillex's then-new label, Owsla, in the summer of 2011. Robinson's debut EP, Spitfire was released on September 13 as the label's first release. After Skrillex and Tiësto tweeted a link to it, Beatport crashed. Robinson later toured North America in support of the EP.

While Robinson was initially known for his "aggressive" electro and complextro music, (Note: Attributed to multiple references:) with Robinson describing his initial sound as "very heavy" and "bass-aggressive", "Language" was his first song to have a greater emphasis on melody. Tatiana Cirisano of Billboard said that "Robinson takes a detour toward a more delicate, trance-like sound", with the song presenting "piercing vocals" followed by "pumping fists to lush synths, a thumping bass kick and euphoric chords".

== Music video ==
A music video to accompany the release of "Language" was first released on YouTube on August 1, 2012, with a total length of three minutes and thirty-three seconds. The music video portrays a young woman (Susannah Hart Jones) running away from wolf-like creatures and befriending a giant-like creature. As of July 2017, the video has over 10.2 million views.

== Reception ==
Although the song was a departure from his earlier sound, "Language" was accepted by audiences, surprising Robinson. In 2017, Tatiana Cirisano of Billboard chose "Language" as the best track in Robinson's discography at the time, writing: "It's no surprise 'Language' is one of the best-known Porter Robinson songs—and our most-loved".

"Language" was how he first conceived the idea for his 2014 debut studio album Worlds.

== In popular media ==
- "Language" was included as part of the soundtrack to the game Forza Horizon, and is heard in the main menu of the game. The song was also added in Forza Horizon 5's Horizon Mixtape radio station as part of its 10th anniversary update.

== Track listing ==
Digital download
No.	Title	Length
1.	"Language" (UK Edit)	3:19
2.	"Language" (Extended Mix)	6:08
3.	"Language" (Instrumental)	6:07
4.	"Language" (Instrumental Edit)	3:42

== Charts ==
Chart performance for "Language"
Chart (2012–2013)	Peak position
Australia (ARIA)	53
Ireland (IRMA)	63
Scotland Singles (OCC)	4
UK Singles (OCC)	9
UK Dance (OCC)	3
UK Indie (OCC)	1
US Dance/Mix Show Airplay (Billboard)	7
US Hot Dance/Electronic Songs (Billboard)	33

== Certifications ==
Certifications for "Language"
Region	Certification	Certified units/sales
Australia (ARIA)	Gold	35,000^{^}
United Kingdom (BPI)	Silver	200,000^{‡}
^{^} Shipments figures based on certification alone.^{‡} Sales+streaming figures based on certification alone.

== Release history ==
Release history and formats for "Language"
Region	Date	Format	Label
United States	April 10, 2012	Digital download	Big Beat
United Kingdom	August 12, 2012	Digital download	Ministry of Sound
Australia	September 21, 2012	Digital download	Ministry of Sound
