= Musician (song) =

2021 single by Porter Robinson

Single by Porter Robinson

from the album Nurture
- Released: March 3, 2021
- Recorded: November 16, 2019 – August 13, 2020
- Genre: Electropop
- Length: 3:58
- Label: Mom + Pop
- Songwriters: Porter Robinson; Gus Lobban; Sarah Midori Perry
- Producer: Porter Robinson

Porter Robinson singles chronology
"Look at the Sky" (2021)	"Musician" (2021)	"Unfold" (2021)

Music video
- "Musician" on YouTube

"Musician" is a song by American record producer Porter Robinson. It is the fifth single from Robinson's second album Nurture, released on March 3, 2021.

== Background and composition ==
In 2019, Robinson worked on an unreleased collaboration with British band Kero Kero Bonito. Samples from the demo would later be used in "Musician".

"Musician" samples the Think break from Lyn Collins' "Think (About It)".

Robinson stated in a tweet that he had a rule for Nurture, which was "no supersaws[,] no 808 subs[,] no classic breakbeats", but he decided to "have fun" with "Musician". In a press release, Robinson stated that "Musician" was one of the very last songs written for Nurture.

The song is meant to feel like a celebration, like I'm reveling in the joy of newfound inspiration. If the rest of Nurture is about me trying to find hope for the future, "Musician" is like a celebration of that hope materializing. It was one of the last songs that I wrote for the album, and it's honestly a celebration of the album itself. That's where the title comes from. It's like, "Alright, I've found my footing, and I know I can really do this now." And I just tried to throw all of my rules away and have as much fun as possible. Ironically enough, this is the least sad song on the album, but this is the song that makes me cry. It's the fun one. I just sound so happy on that song.

== Reception ==
Pitchfork's Colin Joyce said that, on the song, Robinson "mulls the difficulty of making art during tough times, flickering between despair and reassurance", by singing: "I just can't stop, I'm sorry / I can feel a new day dawning." Magnetic Mag's Ryan Middleton stated that the "semi autobiographical track" describes "a eureka moment of finding inspiration." Triple J writer Sose Fuamoli said: "It's here where we can hear him turn that corner and find the love in music that had been missing. The music swells and revels in being uplifting, which makes sense - it’s one of the songs closest to Robinson even today." Sebastian Flores Chong of EDMTunes declared that "Musician" is "an amazing song" with unique and distinct elements, while still resembling Porter Robinson's music style. PopMatters writer Chris Conaton describes "Musician" as "full electropop, with a host of synths, samples, and other electronic sounds providing the music", and further describes it as "a joyous-sounding pop track that sounds like a celebration without becoming cloying."

=== Year-end lists ===
"Musician" was ranked at seventy-fourth place on NPR's annual list of best songs and placed on their list of best electronic songs of the year.

== Music video ==
The music video for "Musician" was released on YouTube on March 18, 2021. It was directed by Waboku and Mah and animated by Dokai Asuka, rui, Ono Hokuto, Oyama Aiko, Sakai Hiroshi, Nishimura Fukutaro and Ryoko K. (Shatter). It has anime influences, similarly to "Shelter" and showing Robinson's "love for Japanese culture and the style of anime", according to We Rave You's Ellie Mullins. The video is about a boy looking to pursue his passion for music at the risk of being outcast from society.

== Charts ==
Chart (2021)	Peak position
US Hot Dance/Electronic Songs (Billboard)	23
