= Ghost Voices =

Single by Virtual Self

from the EP Virtual Self
- Released: November 8, 2017
- Recorded: 2017
- Genre: Trance
- Length: 4:27
- Label: Virtual Self
- Songwriter: Porter Robinson
- Producer: Porter Robinson

Virtual Self singles chronology
"Eon Break" (2017)	"Ghost Voices" (2017)	"Angel Voices" (2018)

Music video
- "Ghost Voices" on YouTube

"Ghost Voices" is a song by American electronic music producer Porter Robinson under the alias Virtual Self. It was released on November 8, 2017 as the second single from the alias' self-titled debut EP, which uses early 2000s sounds and aesthetics. Robinson said that "Ghost Voices" was the easiest song from the EP to compose, and he used a house-styled drum pattern and a trance-styled break. In 2018, the song received an official music video and was remixed by Raito and Robinson himself, the latter remix being called "Angel Voices". "Ghost Voices" received a nomination for Best Dance Recording at the 61st Annual Grammy Awards.

== Production and composition ==
Porter Robinson wrote "Ghost Voices" for the Virtual Self EP, released through an alias of the same name. Robinson used the early 2000s as the main source of inspiration for the sound and visuals. He said the track was much easier to produce when compared to other songs on the EP. Initially, Robinson tried to create a new lead sound similar to the human voice, as well as an ambient sound "where it sounded like she was going to heaven, a very beautiful, sad, nostalgic chord progression." According to him, the initial result sounded cuter than the released version of "Ghost Voices". Robinson said he was playing randomly with the keys; after making the riff, he noticed it was "catchy", which made him write a bassline behind it, resulting in a sound he enjoyed. After this, Robinson wrote the house-styled drum pattern. The first drop was written from the melody into the hook, giving it a dark, mysterious feel. He then focused on creating a "turn-of-century"-inspired, trance-styled break. He spent two or three days editing the vocals from a random demo he had received—a pop performance—to make it sound "ghostly and ethereal".

"Ghost Voices"
"Ghost Voices", a song by Pathselector, includes elements of trance and deep house.

The Virtual Self alias is represented by two characters created by Robinson, Pathselector and Technic-Angel. (Note: In the Virtual Self EP, Pathselector represents tracks "Ghost Voices" and "A.i.ngel (Become God)", while Technic-Angel represents tracks "Particle Arts", "Key" and "Eon Break". According to Billboard's Kat Bein, Pathselector is "white-dressed [and] gold-masked", while Technic-Angel is a "fair-skinned, dark-cloaked harbinger".) Robinson wrote "Ghost Voices" as a Pathselector song; Pathselector's songs were described by Robinson as neotrance, strictly having a trance style, being mid-tempo and having less hardcore influences than Technic-Angel songs. The track has a tempo of 120 BPM. Andrew Rafter wrote to DJ Mag that "Ghost Voices" "[combines] low-slung deep house basslines with trance-y top lines", while Kat Bein of Billboard said it is "a slick, sexy house tune bringing soulful, halftime garage vibes", that has "a shine like dark velvet with fat bass synths and echoes of trance." Philip Sherburne of Pitchfork said that, although the song contains "rushing snare rolls and classic 'Reese' bass", its "lithe vocal flips and slinky air" make it closer to "the post-Disclosure era", being, in turn, the most contemporary-sounding song on the Virtual Self EP. Conversely, Bein described it as the "dankest" song on the EP, and that its "classic house groove and futuristic [touches] beckon you to the dark side of the dance floor and the web."

== Release and reception ==
"Ghost Voices" was released as the second single from the Virtual Self EP on November 8, 2017, following "Eon Break". It was released along with what Kat Bein of Billboard described as a "cool-toned, purple visual" with strong GameCube-era influences. An official music video was released via Robinson's YouTube channel on February 28, 2018. The video presents Virtual Self's two main characters, Pathselector and Technic-Angel, wandering through an old warehouse filled with abandoned computers. A radio edit was released on March 12, and remixes by Raito were released on April 6. On July 22, Robinson released a remix of the song, "Angel Voices"; Bein classified it as happy hardcore.

Billboard staff chose "Ghost Voices" as the 32nd best dance/electronic song of 2017. In 2019, Bein said that the track had become "the project's standout track". In an interview with the same magazine published in February 2018, DJ Calvin Harris stated that "Ghost Voices" made him enjoy dance music again. "Ghost Voices" was nominated for a Grammy Award for Best Dance Recording at the 61st Annual Grammy Awards, marking Robinson's first ever nomination to the award. In a statement to Billboard in January 2019, Robinson said he had not even realized "Ghost Voices" had been submitted for consideration; being nominated made him feel like he won. Billboard staff named it the 18th greatest dance song of the decade.

== Charts ==
Chart (2018)	Peak position
Belgium Bubbling Under (Ultratop Flanders)	Unranked
Belgium Dance (Ultratop Flanders)	19
UK Singles Downloads Chart (Official Charts Company)	79
