= Get Your Wish =

2020 single performed by Porter Robinson

Single by Porter Robinson

from the album Nurture
- Released: January 29, 2020
- Recorded: October 15, 2018 – December 17, 2019
- Genre: Synth-pop
- Length: 3:38
- Label: Mom + Pop
- Songwriter: Porter Robinson
- Producer: Porter Robinson

Porter Robinson singles chronology
"Shelter" (2016)	"Get Your Wish" (2020)	"Something Comforting" (2020)

Music video
- "Get Your Wish" on YouTube

"Get Your Wish" is a song recorded by American electronic music producer Porter Robinson. It was released on January 29, 2020, as the first single from his second studio album Nurture. Robinson wrote, produced, and provided vocals for the track. The song contains elements of 2000s era Japanese animation soundtracks.

An official music video was released alongside the single and features Robinson singing on a wet platform.

== Composition ==
"I realized I shouldn't write music with the expectation that the productivity or achievement will fix my problems, but instead with the hope that my honest expression will move people the way music moves me...'Get Your Wish' is about that breakthrough, which was one of many that helped me through those years. Music started making me happy again."

— Robinson in a letter to his fans.

"Get Your Wish" features Porter Robinson on vocals, effected to make himself sound higher pitched and more feminine. He stated that he felt that it was "easier to talk about painful subjects directly", and subsequently became fond of the effected voice. The lyrics of the song reflect Robinson's views on depression and ego death.

The song is synth-based. Robinson has stated he is a fan of Japanese culture, animation, and video games, and it has inspired his music. This is exemplified by the production of the "Shelter" music video which was written by Robinson and animated by A-1 Pictures, a Japanese animation studio.

== Music video ==
"Get Your Wish" and its music video were released simultaneously, with the video immediately available on Robinson's YouTube channel.

In the official music video, Robinson is seen on a platform covered in water. He pulls a microphone out of the water and begins to sing. The video cuts between Robinson singing and sitting and looking forlorn. During the climax, a background behind the platform displays fireworks, intercut with Robinson singing underwater.

== Track listing ==
"Get Your Wish" track listing
No.	Title	Length
1.	"Get Your Wish"	3:38

Get Your Wish (Remixes) track listing
No.	Title	Length
1.	"Get Your Wish" (DJ Not Porter Robinson Remix)	3:40
2.	"Get Your Wish" (Anamanaguchi Remix)	3:13
Total length:		6:53

== Personnel ==
Credits adapted from Tidal.

- Porter Robinson – producer, composer, lyricist, mixer
- Zino Mikorey – engineer

== Charts ==
=== Weekly charts ===
Chart (2020)	Peak position
US Hot Dance/Electronic Songs (Billboard)	12
Mexico Ingles Airplay (Billboard)	24

=== Year-end charts ===
Chart (2020)	Position
US Hot Dance/Electronic Songs (Billboard)	95

== Release history ==
Version	Region	Date	Format(s)	Label
Original	Various	January 29, 2020	Digital download; streaming	Mom + Pop
Anamanaguchi Remix	Various	July 15, 2020	Digital download; streaming	Mom + Pop
DJ Not Porter Robinson Remix	Various	July 22, 2020	Digital download; streaming	Mom + Pop
