= Spitfire (EP) =

2011 EP by Porter Robinson

EP by Porter Robinson
- Released: September 13, 2011
- Genre: Dubstep; Electro house; Moombahcore; Progressive house; Trance
- Length: 61:54 (Note: Robinson's original tracks account for 35:46 of the EP, while the remaining 26:08 are remixes of those songs.)
- Label: Owsla
- Producer: Porter Robinson; Knife Party; Kill the Noise; SKisM; Downlink; Mikkas

Porter Robinson chronology
Spitfire (2011)	Worlds (2014)

Spitfire is the debut extended play (EP) by American electronic music producer Porter Robinson, released on September 13, 2011, through Owsla. After releasing his 2010 single "Say My Name", Robinson expressed desire to explore different musical genres by producing an EP, diverging from his traditional eurodance style. Spanning a range of genres, Spitfire marked the inaugural release on Owsla and caused Beatport to crash following its promotion by musicians Skrillex and Tiësto. The EP charted at UK Dance Albums, Dance/Electronic Albums and Heatseekers Albums, with Robinson subsequently embarking on a tour to promote it. Songs "The State" and "Unison" received particular attention for their libertarian themes and use in DJ sets, respectively.

== Background and composition ==
In 2010, Porter Robinson released his first hit, "Say My Name", which topped Beatport's electro house charts. Robinson expressed desire to produce an extended play (EP), as it provided an opportunity to experiment with different musical styles that could not necessarily appeal to his fans. While his first music had influences from "the cheesiest Eurodance", he later discovered bass-heavy acts such as Wolfgang Gartner, Skrillex, and Deadmau5, who became his new inspirations. Robinson wished for Spitfire to be "something fresh, something energetic and detailed", but with less glitch-like, random elements compared to his previous works.

Kerri Mason wrote for Billboard that the EP "toes the line between irresistible pop songcraft and dirty electronic throwdown with beyond-his-years craftiness", while also describing it as "brazenly bombastic". David Marchese of Spin said that the album adds "blasts of Moombahton and dubstep to intricately detailed bangers", such as the title track and "The State". John Ochoa of DJ Mag found that the EP's songs spanned multiple genres: aggressive dubstep (with the title track), heavy electro house (with "Unison"), moombahcore (with "100% In the Bitch"), progressive house (with "Vandalism"), and trance (with "The Seconds").

== Release and reception ==
After capturing Skrillex's interest with "Say My Name", Robinson signed with Skrillex's then-new label, Owsla, in the summer of 2011; Robinson said he liked Owsla's approach to its artists, being more informal. Spitfire was released on September 13 as the label's first release. After Skrillex and Tiësto tweeted a link to it, Beatport crashed. The album had more first-week album sales on the platform than any other since Scary Monsters and Nice Sprites (2010), by Skrillex. In less than two weeks, the EP's tracks had received 27,115 sales on the platform. It peaked at number 30 on Official Charts Company's UK Dance Albums, 11 on Billboard's Dance/Electronic Albums, and 10 on the same magazine's Heatseekers Albums. Robinson later toured North America in support of Spitfire. A remix EP, Spitfire EP Bonus Remixes, was released on July 3, 2012, containing three remixes.

Akshay Bhansali of MTV described it as "an exceptional array of music". After the EP's release, libertarian websites including The Daily Paul, Lew Rockwell's blog, and Reason expressed interest towards "The State", highlighting its incorporation of excerpts from For a New Liberty by Murray N. Rothbard, as voiced by Jeff Riggenbach. LA Weekly and Reason subsequently named Robinson the "libertarian dubstep guy". Retrospectively, DJ Mag's John Ochoa thought that the EP was bold, "giving an early glimpse into the budding producer's fearless approach to sonic experimentalism". In 2017, Tatiana Cirisano of Billboard chose "100% In the Bitch" and "Unison" as the ninth and seventh best tracks in Robinson's discography at the time, respectively. Regarding "Unison", Cirisano said that the track was "near-universally recognized among dance club crowds", "a force in the genre" and a "standout song". The Knife Party remix of the song, which is included in the EP, also became popular, with Bhansali describing it as "among the more popular DJ set staples" in 2012.

== Track listing ==
Spitfire track listing
No.	Title	Length
1.	"Spitfire"	6:45
2.	"Unison"	5:50
3.	"100% in the Bitch"	4:11
4.	"Vandalism" (featuring Amba Shepherd)	7:20
5.	"The State"	5:57
6.	"The Seconds" (featuring Jano)	5:43
7.	"Unison" (Knife Party Remix)	4:58
8.	"Unison" (Mikkas Remix)	6:02
9.	"100% in the Bitch" (Downlink Remix)	5:33
10.	"The State" (SKisM Remix)	5:24
11.	"Spitfire" (Kill the Noise Remix)	4:11
Total length:		61:54

Spitfire EP Bonus Remixes
No.	Title	Length
1.	"Vandalism" (Lazy Rich Remix)	6:15
2.	"Vandalism" (Dirtyloud Remix)	4:31
3.	"Spitfire" (Bjorn Akesson Remix)	8:54
Total length:		19:40

asample credits

- "100% in the Bitch" contains excerpts from "Namasensei's Japanese Lessons", by YouTube user bumnumba1.
- "The State" contains excerpts from For a New Liberty by Murray N. Rothbard, as narrated by Jeff Riggenbach.

== Chart performance ==
Chart performance for Spitfire
Chart (2011)	Peak position
UK Dance Albums (OCC)	30
US Top Dance Albums (Billboard)	11
US Heatseekers Albums (Billboard)	10
