= Madeon discography =

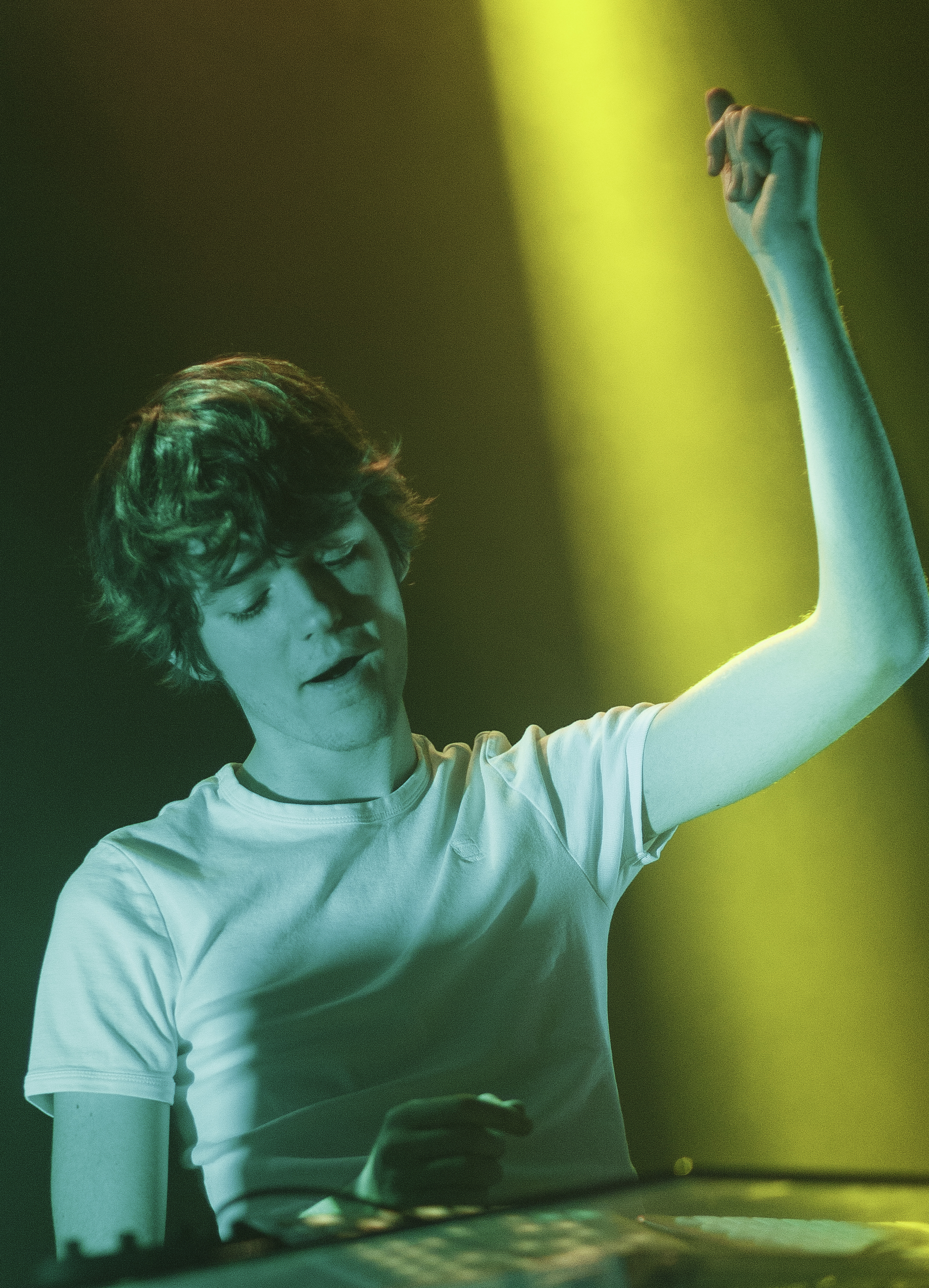
- Madeon live in Brussels, 2015
- Studio albums: 3
- EPs: 6
- Singles: 21
- DJ mixes: 1

French DJ and record producer Madeon has released three studio albums, six EPs, one DJ mix, twenty-one singles, and several other releases.

== Albums ==
=== Studio albums ===
Title	Details	Peak chart positions									
Title	Details	FRA	AUS	BEL (FL)	BEL (WA)	JPN	SCO	UK	UK Dance	US	US Dance
Adventure	Released: 27 March 2015; Label: Columbia; Formats: CD, digital download, vinyl	29	31	169	118	35	39	30	4	43	1
Good Faith	Released: 15 November 2019; Label: Columbia; Formats: CD, digital download, vinyl	—	—	—	—	—	—	— (Note: Good Faith did not enter the UK Albums Chart, but peaked at number 83 on the UK Album Downloads Chart.)	2	82	1
Victory	Released: 26 June 2026; Label: Mom + Pop; Formats: CD, digital download, vinyl	—	—	—	—	—	—	—	—	—	—
"—" denotes a recording that did not chart or was not released.

== Extended plays ==
Title	Details
The City	Released: 8 October 2012; Label: Popcultur; Format: Digital download
Japan Only	Released: 22 October 2013; Label: Popcultur; Format: Digital download
You're On (Remixes)	Released: 23 January 2015; Label: Popcultur; Format: Digital download
Pay No Mind (Remixes)	Released: 28 August 2015; Label: Popcultur; Format: Digital download
Shelter: Complete Edition (with Porter Robinson)	Released: February 15, 2017; Label: SMEJ; Formats: CD, Blu-ray
12122017 (Celine)	Released: 1 September 2020; Label: Self-released; Format: Vinyl 12"

== DJ mixes ==
Title	Details
NYE 2021	Released: 23 December 2020; Format: Digital download

== Singles ==
Title	Year	Peak chart positions										Certifications	Album
Title	Year	FRA	BEL (FL)	BEL (WA)	HUN	JPN	SCO	UK	UK Dance	US Sales	US Dance	Certifications	Album
"Gold"	2009	—	—	—	—	—	—	—	—	—	—		Non-album singles
"The Time Has Come"	2009	—	—	—	—	—	—	—	—	—	—		Non-album singles
"For You"	2010	—	—	—	—	—	—	—	—	—	—		Japan Only EP
"Shuriken"	2010	—	—	—	—	—	—	—	—	—	—		Japan Only EP
"Icarus"	2012	—	74	—	—	—	23	22	5	—	—		The City and Adventure (Deluxe)
"Finale" (featuring Nicholas Petricca)	2012	197	62	67	—	—	28	35	8	—	40		The City and Adventure (Deluxe)
"The City"	2012	—	74	71	13	—	—	74	16	9	32		The City and Adventure (Deluxe)
"Technicolor"	2013	—	—	—	—	—	—	— (Note: "Technicolor" did not enter the UK Singles Chart, but peaked at number eight on the UK Physical Singles Chart Top 100.)	—	—	—		Adventure (Deluxe)
"Cut the Kid"	2014	—	—	—	—	—	—	—	—	—	—		Adventure (Deluxe)
"Imperium"	2014	—	127	—	—	—	—	142	32	—	—		Adventure
"You're On" (featuring Kyan)	2014	36	73	67	—	—	—	—	31	—	25		Adventure
"Pay No Mind" (featuring Passion Pit)	2015	—	78	—	—	67	—	—	—	—	29		Adventure
"Home"	2015	—	—	—	—	—	—	—	—	—	42		Adventure
"Nonsense" (featuring Mark Foster)	2015	—	—	—	—	—	—	—	—	—	35		Adventure
"Shelter" (with Porter Robinson)	2016	126	— (Note: "Shelter" did not enter the Flanders Ultratop 50, but peaked as an "extra tip" on the Ultratip chart.)	—	—	64	—	—	—	3	16	RIAA: Gold	Non-album single
"All My Friends"	2019	—	—	—	—	—	—	—	—	—	16		Good Faith
"Dream Dream Dream"	2019	—	—	—	—	—	—	—	—	—	37		Good Faith
"Be Fine"	2019	—	—	—	—	—	—	—	—	—	30		Good Faith
"No Fear No More" (Remix featuring EarthGang)	2020	—	—	—	—	—	—	—	—	—	—		Non-album single
"The Prince"	2020	—	—	—	—	—	—	—	—	—	— (Note: "The Prince" did not enter the US Hot Dance/Electronic Songs chart but peaked at number 21 on the US Dance Digital Song Sales chart.)		Non-album single
"Love You Back"	2022	—	—	—	—	—	—	—	—	—	35		Non-album single
"Gonna Be Good"	2023	—	—	—	—	—	—	—	—	—	—		Non-album single
"All Ur Luv" (with Wavedash featuring Toro y Moi)	2024	—	—	—	—	—	—	—	—	—	—		Tempo
"Believe It" (with Louis the Child)	2024	—	—	—	—	—	—	—	—	—	— (Note: "Believe It" did not enter the US Hot Dance/Electronic Songs chart but peaked at number 30 on the US Dance Airplay chart.)		The Sun Comes Up
"Hi!"	2025	—	—	—	—	—	—	—	—	—	—		Victory
"Car Crash Baby"	2025	—	—	—	—	—	—	—	—	—	—		Victory
"Fire Away" (featuring Slayyyter)	2026	—	—	—	—	—	—	—	—	—	—		Victory
"Red Jacket" (featuring Sam Gellaitry)	2026	—	—	—	—	—	—	—	—	—	—		Victory
"—" denotes a single that did not chart or was not released in that territory.

== Other charted songs ==
Title	Year	Peak chart positions	Album
Title	Year	US Dance	Album
"No Fear No More"	2019	32	Good Faith
"Miracle"	2019	38	Good Faith

== Remixes ==
Title	Year	Artist
"Smile Like You Mean It"	2010	The Killers
"DJ"	2010	Alphabeat
"Friday Night"	2010	David Latour
"The Island"	2010	Pendulum
"Que Veux Tu"	2011	Yelle
"Raise Your Weapon"	2011	deadmau5
"The Night Out"	2012	Martin Solveig
"iPod Touch"	2026	Ninajirachi

=== Mash-ups ===
Title	Year
"Wolfgang Gartner Anthology"	2010
"Pop Culture"	2011
"Radio 1 Minimix"	2012
"Triple J Mix"	2013

== Songwriting and production credits ==
Title	Year	Artist	Album	Credits
"Tokyo Cries" (Discothèque remix)	2011	Glenn Morrison	Non-album single	—N/a
"Sunshine"	2012	Picture Book	At Last	—N/a
"Stay Awake"	2012	Ellie Goulding	Halcyon Days	Featured artist; songwriter; producer
"Panic Station" (alternate version mixed by Madeon)	2013	Muse (mistaken as a remix)	The 2nd Law	Engineer
"Venus"	2013	Lady Gaga	Artpop	Songwriter; co-producer
"Mary Jane Holland"	2013	Lady Gaga	Artpop	Songwriter; producer
"Gypsy"	2013	Lady Gaga	Artpop	Songwriter; producer
"Changing of the Seasons"	2013	Two Door Cinema Club	Changing of the Seasons	Producer
"Always in My Head"	2014	Coldplay	Ghost Stories	"Extra magic" (technical)
"O"	2014	Coldplay	Ghost Stories	"Extra magic" (technical)
"No Hands"	2018	Ric Wilson	Non-album single	Co-produced with Lido
"911"	2020	Lady Gaga	Chromatica	Songwriter; producer
"Beside You"	2021	Keshi	Non-album single	Producer
"Kiss Me Right"	2025	Keshi	Requiem (Deluxe)	Songwriter; producer
