= Shelter Live Tour =

2016–17 concert tour by Porter Robinson and Madeon

- Back-to-back tour by Madeon and Porter Robinson
- Location: United States; Canada; United Kingdom; Amsterdam; France; Taiwan; Japan; Australia
- Start date: September 29, 2016
- End date: April 23, 2017
- Legs: 5
- No. of shows: 36 in North America; 3 in Europe; 2 in Asia; 3 in Australia; 43 in total
Porter Robinson chronology
Worlds Live Tour	Shelter Live Tour	Nurture Live Tour
Madeon chronology
Pixel Empire Tour	Shelter Live Tour	Good Faith Live

The Shelter Live Tour was a collaborative concert tour by French DJ and record producer Madeon and American DJ and record producer Porter Robinson in support of their single "Shelter". The tour visited North America, Europe, Asia and Australia from 29 September 2016 to 23 April 2017.

== Background ==
On 11 August 2016, along with the release of "Shelter", Madeon and Porter Robinson announced that they would be doing a back-to-back live show, featuring them performing live together.

On 12 September 2016, the duo announced new dates for the tour.

On 15 September 2016, due to the overwhelming demand, the duo announced they would be adding two more shows in New York City and Philadelphia. The next day, they announced that tickets for all shows were on sale, and also announced the opening acts: San Holo, Danger, Fakear and Robotaki.

The tour featured a 75-minute set combining music from both Porter Robinson and Madeon into one enormous tapestry centered around a three-track core of "Language", "Technicolor", and "Shelter". The set opened with a stripped-down bit of "Language" as the intro for "Shelter" and closed with an encore that mirrors the pattern via an acoustic "Shelter" transitioning into "Language" (with samples from "Imperium"). The main melodies from each song were featured throughout the show.

== Setlist ==
1. "Shelter" (With "Language" hook intro and samples of "Divinity")
2. "Pay No Mind" / "Easy" (With samples of Nero – "The Thrill" (Porter Robinson Remix))
3. "Sad Machine" / "You're On" (With samples of "Only Way Out")
4. "You're On"
5. "OK" / "Lionhearted" (With samples of "Albatros" and "La Lune")
6. "Flicker" (With samples of "Pay No Mind")
7. "Finale" / "Cut the Kid"
8. "ID" (With samples of "Sad Machine" and "Cut the Kid")
9. "Imperium" (With samples of "Ubelkeit")
10. "Pop Culture" (With samples of "Say My Name")
11. "Technicolor" / "Divinity" / "Innocence" (With samples of "Hear The Bells")
12. "La Lune" / "Sea of Voices" / "Natural Light" (2016 edit)
13. "Fresh Static Snow"
14. "Home" (With samples of "Shelter" and "Lionhearted")
15. "Beings"
16. "Pixel Empire" (With samples of "Shelter")
17. "Fellow Feeling" / "Icarus" (With samples of "Pixel Empire")
18. "Goodbye to a World" (With samples of "Natural Light" and "Home")
19. "Shelter" (acoustic version) / "Language" (With samples of "Imperium" and "Technicolor") (Encore)

== Tour dates ==
Date	City	Country	Venue	Opening acts
North America (Leg one)
29 September 2016	Atlanta	United States	The Tabernacle	Fakear; Robotaki
29 September 2016	Atlanta	United States	Gold Room (DJ set)	—N/a
1 October 2016	Oklahoma City	United States	The Criterion	Fakear; Robotaki
2 October 2016 (Note: The concerts on October 2 and 9, 2016 at Zilker Park in Austin were a part of the Austin City Limits Music Festival.)	Austin	United States	Zilker Park	—N/a
4 October 2016	Royal Oak	United States	Royal Oak Music Theatre	Fakear; Robotaki
5 October 2016	Chicago	United States	Aragon Ballroom	Fakear; Robotaki
5 October 2016	Chicago	United States	The Mid (DJ set)	—N/a
6 October 2016	Kansas City	United States	Arvest Bank Theatre at The Midland	Fakear; Robotaki
7 October 2016	Dallas	United States	South Side Ballroom	Fakear; Robotaki
8 October 2016	Houston	United States	Revention Music Center	Fakear; Robotaki
9 October 2016	Austin	United States	Zilker Park	—N/a
9 October 2016	Austin	United States	Emo's (DJ set)	Fakear; Robotaki
North America (Leg two)
8 November 2016	St. Louis	United States	The Pageant	Danger; Robotaki
9 November 2016	Indianapolis	United States	The Pavilion	Danger; Robotaki
10 November 2016	Washington	United States	Echostage	Danger; Robotaki
11 November 2016	Philadelphia	United States	Electric Factory	Danger; Robotaki
13 November 2016	Toronto	Canada	Danforth Music Hall	Danger; Robotaki
13 November 2016	Toronto	Canada	The Hoxton (DJ set)	—N/a
14 November 2016	Montreal	Canada	Métropolis	Danger; Robotaki
15 November 2016	Boston	United States	Orpheum Theatre	Danger; Robotaki
16 November 2016	Washington	United States	Echostage	Danger; Robotaki
17 November 2016	New York City	United States	The Theater at Madison Square Garden	Danger; Robotaki
18 November 2016	New York City	United States	The Theater at Madison Square Garden	Danger; Robotaki
19 November 2016	Philadelphia	United States	Electric Factory	Danger; Robotaki
23 November 2016	San Francisco	United States	Bill Graham Civic Auditorium	San Holo; Robotaki
25 November 2016	San Francisco	United States	Bill Graham Civic Auditorium	San Holo; Robotaki
26 November 2016	Los Angeles	United States	Microsoft Theater	San Holo; Robotaki
27 November 2016	Los Angeles	United States	Shrine Auditorium	San Holo; Robotaki
28 November 2016	Los Angeles	United States	Shrine Auditorium	San Holo; Robotaki
29 November 2016 (Note: The show on November 29, 2016 in San Diego was originally scheduled to take place at The Observatory North Park.)	San Diego	United States	Valley View Casino Center	San Holo; Robotaki
1 December 2016	Denver	United States	Fillmore Auditorium	San Holo; Robotaki
2 December 2016	Salt Lake City	United States	The Complex	San Holo; Robotaki
3 December 2016	Sacramento	United States	McClellan Park	San Holo; Robotaki
6 December 2016	Vancouver	Canada	Vogue Theatre	San Holo; Robotaki
7 December 2016	Vancouver	Canada	Vogue Theatre	San Holo; Robotaki
8 December 2016	Portland	United States	Veterans Memorial Coliseum	Audien; Robotaki
9 December 2016	Spokane (cancelled)	United States	Knitting Factory	San Holo; Robotaki
10 December 2016	Seattle	United States	WaMu Theater	San Holo; Robotaki
Europe (Leg three)
7 February 2017	London	United Kingdom	O2 Forum Kentish Town	Louis the Child
8 February 2017	Amsterdam	Netherlands	Melkweg	Louis the Child
9 February 2017	Paris	France	L'Olympia	Louis the Child
Asia (Leg four)
19 February 2017 (Note: The concert on February 19, 2017 at Dajia Riverside Park in Taipei was a part of We Are Connected.)	Taipei	Taiwan	Dajia Riverside Park (DJ set)	—N/a
21 February 2017	Tokyo	Japan	Zepp DiverCity	—N/a
Australia (Leg five)
24 February 2017	Brisbane	Australia	Riverstage	Lido; Elk Road
25 February 2017	Sydney	Australia	Hordern Pavilion	Lido; Elk Road
26 February 2017	Melbourne	Australia	Hisense Arena	Lido; Elk Road
North America (Leg six)
16 April 2017 (Note: The concerts on April 16 and 23, 2017 at Empire Polo Club in Indio were a part of the Coachella Valley Music and Arts Festival.)	Indio	United States	Empire Polo Club	—N/a
23 April 2017	Indio	United States	Empire Polo Club	—N/a
