= The M Machine =

American electronic music duo

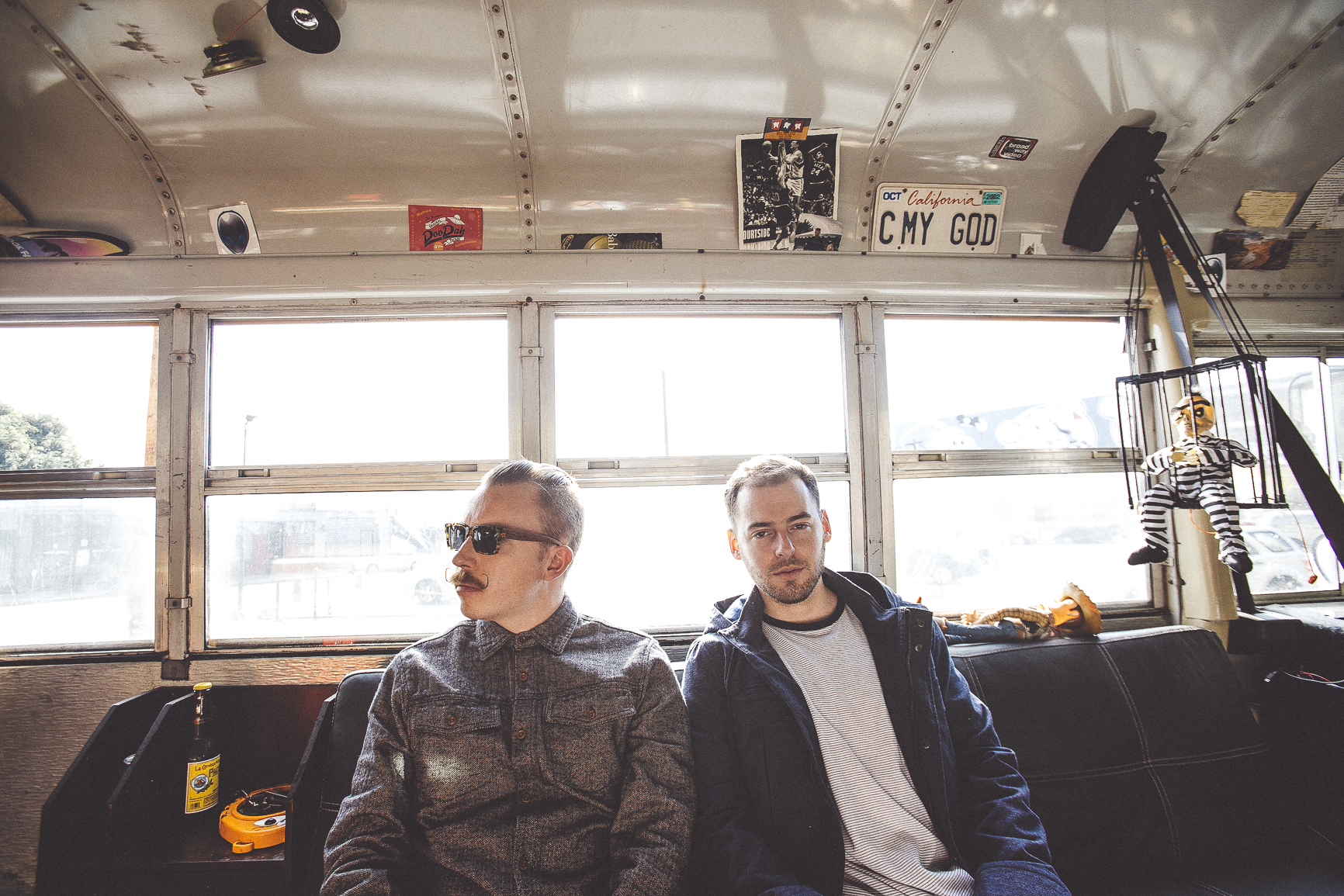

Background information
- Origin: San Francisco, California, United States
- Genres: Electro house; alternative dance; progressive house
- Years active: 2011–2017 (on hiatus)
- Labels: Owsla, Mad Zoo
- Members: Ben "Swardy" Swardlick; Eric Luttrell
- Past members: Andy Coenen

The M Machine is an American electronic music duo from San Francisco, California, United States, formed in 2011 and currently consisting of Ben Swardlick and Eric Luttrell. They have released four EPs, a single and two remix collections on Skrillex's label Owsla. The group has reached the overall #1 slot on Beatport on multiple occasions.

== Music career ==
The group originally went by the moniker Pance Party. They initially had viral success with a teaser video for their planned full-length album Metropolis, which later became split into two EPs. Their double A-side "Promise Me A Rose Garden" / "Glow" was released on Skrillex's label OWSLA in 2011, becoming the #1 Electro House release on Beatport, and #2 overall release for an entire week. "Promise Me A Rose Garden" was named Hottest Record in the World on October 20, 2011, by Zane Lowe on BBC Radio 1.

In April 2012, the group released Metropolis Pt. I, the first installment of their two-part concept album. Metropolis Pt. I premiered online in Rolling Stone magazine, followed by a worldwide release the next day, reaching number one on the Beatport overall chart. Metropolis Pt. II was released February 19, 2013 on Owsla to critical acclaim, also reaching the number one overall spot on Beatport.

Inspired by Fritz Lang's influential film Metropolis, together the two EPs tell the story of the dystopian city of Metropolis. A text/illustrated version of the story is also available in the form of digital liner notes on the band's website. The Metropolis saga was completed with the release of Metropolis Remixed, a revamped retrospective of the previous two EPs that featured remixes from Kill The Noise, Digitalism, Robotaki, and more.

Also in January 2014, the group released the single "Superflat" on OWSLA, followed by the Just Like EP in November of that year. Just Like signaled a change in direction as the group moved towards more underground, club-oriented sound. A remix pack, Just Like Remixes was released in April 2015 featuring Manila Killa, CRNKN, and Worthy among others.

On January 28, 2015, Andy announced his departure from the group to pursue his interest in programming and technology, making the former trio a duo.

On February 23, 2017, they released their debut album Glare on Mad Zoo.

The group has toured in support of acts including Skrillex, Porter Robinson, The Glitch Mob, Madeon, Markus Schulz, and more, in addition to a slew of their own headline runs. They have also played premier music festivals including Ultra Music Festival, Electric Daisy Carnival, Holy Ship!, Hard Summer, Outside Lands, South by Southwest, TomorrowWorld, Mysteryland, Electric Zoo and Shambhala.

The group has contributed official remixes for Bruno Mars, Passion Pit, Empire of the Sun, Dog Blood, Madeon, Mat Zo, Arty, Datsik & Kill The Noise.

== Discography ==
=== Studio albums ===
List of studio albums, with release date, label and track listing shown
Title	Album details	Track listing
Glare	Released: 23 February 2017; Label: Mad Zoo	1. "Blind (featuring Luisa Gerstein); 2. "Voyeur"; 3. "The Warehouse"; 4. "I AM"; 5. "Heart Sandwich"; 6. "We Had It All"; 7. "Some Animal"; 8. "Prairie Day"; 9. "Talking Machine"; 10. "Honeybucket (featuring Phantasmosis); 11. "Walking Underwater"; 12. "Another Parachute Ending"

=== EPs ===
Title	EP details	Tracks
Metropolis Part I	Released: 24 April 2012; Label: Owsla	1. "Immigrants"; 2. "Deep Search"; 3. "A King Alone"; 4. "Faces"; 5. "Black"; 6. "Shadow in the Rose Garden"
Metropolis Part II	Released: 19 February 2013; Label: Owsla	1. "The Palace" (featuring Blake Hazard); 2. "Ghosts in the Machine" (featuring Pennybirdrabbit); 3. "Tiny Anthem"; 4. "Moon Song"; 5. "Schadenfreude"; 6. "Luma"
Metropolis Remixed	Released: 27 August 2013; Label: Owsla	1. "Moon Song (Digitalism Remix)"; 2. "Ghosts in the Machine (Kill the Noise Remix)"; 3. "A King Alone (Robotaki Remix)"; 4. "Data Palace"; 5. "Tiny Anthem (Shinichi Osawa Remix)"; 6. "Schadenfreude (Tantrum Desire Remix); 7. "Shadow in the Rose Garden (Matt Lange Remix)"; 8. "Faces (Proxy Remix)"; 9. "Black (Trifonic Remix)"
Just Like	Released: 11 November 2014; Label: Owsla	1. "Just Like"; 2. "Don't Speak"; 3. "Over/Love"; 4. "Pluck Pluck"; 5. "So Change"
Just Like Remixes	Released: 23 April 2015; Label: Owsla	1. "Don't Speak (Manila Killa Remix)"; 2. "Just Like (Worthy's Space Cadet Remix)"; 3. "Just Like (CRNKN Remix)"; 4. "Just Like (Evil Nine Remix)"; 5. "Don't Speak (Kazimier Remix)"
Metropolis: The B-Sides	Released: 11 Aug 2015 – 18 Aug 2015; Label: Self–released	1. "Happy Land"; 2. "Diamonds"; 3. "Specific Hell"; 4. "Radiolight"; 5. "Space Design"; 6. "When It's Gone"

=== Singles ===
Year	Track	Label
2011	"Trafalgar"	Self-released
2011	"Promise Me A Rose Garden / Glow"	Owsla
2013	"Additional Faces"	Owsla
2014	"Superflat"	Owsla
2015	" Mr. Voice And The Cloudtop Glide Along"	Self-released

=== Other appearances ===
Year	Song	Album	Label
2012	"No Fun Intended"	Owsla Presents: Free Treats Vol. II	Owsla
2013	"Lift" (Digitalism featuring The M Machine)	Lift EP	Kitsuné

=== Remixes ===
Year	Track	Artist	Label
2011	"Cal State Anthem"	PeaceTreaty feat. Kissed With a Noise	Self-released
2012	"Take A Walk"	Passion Pit	Columbia Records
2012	"Lightspeed"	Kill The Noise & Datsik	Owsla
2012	"The City"	Madeon	popcultur
2013	"Locked Out of Heaven"	Bruno Mars	Atlantic Records
2013	"Together We Are"	Arty	Big Beat Records
2013	"Middle Finger Pt. 2"	Dog Blood	Owsla / Boys Noize Records
2013	"DNA" (The M Machine Remix for Helios)	Empire of the Sun	Self-released
2013	"DNA" (The M Machine Remix for Apollo)	Empire of the Sun	Self-released
2013	"Lucid Dreams"	Mat Zo	Anjunabeats
2014	"Sound of Erasing"	Rubblebucket	Self-released
2015	"On The Ground"	Rubblebucket	Communion Records
2016	"All That's Left"	Manila Killa	Next Wave Records
2018	"Sooner Or Later"	Trifonic	Trifonic Music LLC
