= Rahul Suntah =

Mauritian composer, music producer and pianist

- Born: 6 June 1997 (age 29); Quatre Bornes, Mauritius
- Origin: Mauritius
- Genres: Pop; Classical; Jazz; Electronic; Bollywood; Mauritian Sega; Film score
- Occupations: Composer, arranger, music producer, pianist
- Instruments: Piano; keyboards; synthesizer; ROLI Seaboard; Novation Launchpad
- Years active: 2005–present
- Labels: DGP Music; Next Music; CD Baby
- Website: rahulsuntah.com

Rahul Suntah (born 6 June 1997) is a Mauritian composer, music producer and pianist. Suntah received coverage from BBC and ITV for his viral piano covers of popular songs and original compositions reaching millions of views on Instagram as well as his innovative piano techniques.

== Early life ==
Suntah is a classically trained pianist who started learning the piano aged 8, at the Frederic Chopin Conservatory of Music situated in his hometown in Mauritius where he studied ABRSM Piano and Music Theory for 7 years. Suntah attended the Collège du Saint-Esprit in Mauritius from 2009 to 2016 for his Higher School Certificate and his A-level. Suntah pursued his tertiary studies abroad in the UK and got his Bachelor's degree in Audio and Music Technology from UWE Bristol in 2019 and his Master's degree in Composition for Film and Television from the University of Bristol in the UK in 2021. Suntah temporarily moved to Carlisle after his studies before moving to London in 2022 for 2 years where he worked as a professional pianist and a music teacher.

== Career ==
Suntah began composing music at the age of 13 and was a self-taught pianist after finishing his ABRSM Grade 5 exams. After finishing high school, Suntah decided to pursue his studies in Audio and Music Technology at the University of the West of England in Bristol in 2016, graduating in July 2019 with focus in composition, production and sound engineering. During his time at university he was among the winners of the annual UWE Bristol Talent Show in 2019. In February 2020, Suntah independently released his debut EP entitled Piano Stories which he composed and produced. In August 2020, Suntah was among the finalists of the Mauritian talent show Zenes Montre To Talan depi Lakaz. In early 2021, Suntah was featured as a spotlight artist on BBC Music Introducing talking about his original composition Paradise Island which eventually made the list for the top tracks of 2021. Suntah started getting recognition online and attracted a following after several of his videos went viral on Instagram and Facebook such as his piano rendition of Mozart's Rondo Alla Turca. His first viral video was his cover of Despacito in 2017, which had attracted over ten thousand followers on his instagram page in the span of a few weeks. As of today, his most viral videos are his piano reinterpretations of Interstellar and Gulabi Aankhen.

Suntah pursued a Master's degree in Film Scoring on scholarship at the University of Bristol, graduating in 2021. His cover of Gorillaz's Feel Good Inc. caught the attention of the American video show Right This Minute, was featured on BBC Radio Bristol's website in October 2021 and currently has millions of views on his instagram. Suntah was invited to play at a concert in Manchester Cathedral in February 2022 and was interviewed by British news programme ITV News about his musical career and his first UK concert. Suntah subsequently had his first solo concerts in Bristol and London in 2022. Suntah's cover of I'm So Excited by The Pointer Sisters was used in Maandag 's TV advert, a Dutch recruitment agency promoting new jobs in Amsterdam. Suntah was invited to star in the commercial in November 2022 directed and produced by The Family Amsterdam, an advertising agency working with the likes of Cara Delevingne and Snoop Dogg and was also invited to open for Maandag 's award show. Suntah was featured as a green room guest on BBC Radio London to chat about his career and perform live on radio. Suntah invited a young pianist named Rebecca Seziba from Cape Town, who went viral in early 2023, to join him in an online virtual duet for his original composition Home Bound. The collaboration received coverage from e.tv and Classic FM and was shared by American actress Viola Davis on her Instagram page. Suntah had several sold-out headline shows in his homeland Mauritius and was nominated for The Outstanding Young Person Award by JCI Mauritius in 2025. In October 2026, Suntah was invited as a talent guest to the BFI London Film Festival and the European premiere of the movie Behemoth! starring Pedro Pascal. Suntah released his debut original piano album Piano Fantasia in October 2026 receiving support from Apple Music's New Music Daily editorial playlist for his original track Minwi (Mauritian Creole word meaning Midnight) which combines Jazz, Mauritian Sega rhythms and Indian classical music influences.

== Musical style and influences ==
Suntah combines classical and popular music influences as well as using unconventional piano extended techniques and looping technology with a Novation Launchpad in his performances. This setup allows Suntah to perform as a one-man band while also incorporating a wide range of other musical genres into his music and performances such as Jazz, Pop, Rock, R&B, Electronic, EDM, Bollywood and Mauritian Sega.

Suntah has cited influences including Beethoven, Mozart, Chopin, Hans Zimmer, John Williams, Charlie Puth, Jacob Collier, Jamie Cullum, Daft Punk, Michael Jackson, Queen, Peter Bence, and The Piano Guys.

== Discography ==
List of Studio Albums/EPs/Singles by Rahul Suntah
Album/EP/Single	Details
Piano Stories (EP)	Released: 1 February 2020; Format: Digital download, Streaming; Tracklist: 1. Space Wander; 2. Stardust Lullaby; 3. Moon Waltz; 4. Paradise Island; 5. Home Bound
Cinematic Wonders (Album)	Released: 19 December 2021; Format: Digital download, Streaming
Horizons (Single)	Released: 7 November 2022; Format: Digital download, Streaming
Super Piano (Album)	Released: 21 December 2023; Format: Digital download, Streaming
Piano Fantasia (Album)	Released: 2 October 2026; Format: Digital download, Streaming

== Published Sheet Music Arrangements ==
- Paradise Island, Rahul Suntah
- Space Wander, Rahul Suntah
- Home Bound, Rahul Suntah
- Fly me to the Moon, Frank Sinatra
- Blinding Lights, The Weeknd
- Underdog, Alicia Keys
- She Will Be Loved, Maroon 5
- Shape of You, Ed Sheeran
- Despacito, Luis Fonsi & Daddy Yankee
- Échame la Culpa, Luis Fonsi & Demi Lovato
- The Avengers, Alan Silvestri
- Señorita, Shawn Mendes & Camila Cabello
- Another One Bites the Dust, Queen
- Snowman, Sia
- STAY, Justin Bieber & The Kid LAROI.

== Awards ==
Year	Organisation	Award	Result	Ref
2019	UWE Bristol	UWE Bristol's Got Talent 2019	Won	
2020	Ministry of Youth, Empowerment, Sports & Recreation	Zenes Montre To Talan Depi Lakaz 2020	Nominated	
2025	JCI Mauritius	The Outstanding Young Person Award 2025	Nominated	
