= Good Faith (Madeon album) =

Studio album by Madeon
- Released: 15 November 2019
- Recorded: 2016–2019
- Studios: Nantes; New York; Ålesund; Los Angeles
- Genres: Nu-disco; electropop
- Length: 35:07
- Label: Columbia
- Producer: Hugo Pierre Leclercq

Madeon chronology
Adventure (2015)	Good Faith (2019)	Victory (2026)

Singles from Good Faith
- 1. "All My Friends" Released: 31 May 2019; 2. "Dream Dream Dream" Released: 10 July 2019; 3. "Be Fine" Released: 16 October 2019

Good Faith is the second studio album by French DJ and record producer Madeon. It was released on 15 November 2019 through Columbia Records. The album features contributions and vocals from Callie Day, Spoonface, Audra Mae, James the Human, Brasstracks, and the West Los Angeles Children's Choir. The album was promoted by three singles: "All My Friends", "Dream Dream Dream", and "Be Fine". The album received mixed to positive reviews from critics.

== Background ==
In late 2016, Leclercq released a joint single with friend and fellow electronic producer Porter Robinson, "Shelter". He took a break from touring in late 2017 and 2018 to work on his second album. Leclercq felt that the sincere style of lyric writing he used for "Shelter" could be incorporated into his Madeon music, and not simply have his music production and songs be a vehicle for other people's stories. He recorded and wrote the album while traveling in Europe and across North America.

Leclercq released his single "All My Friends" in May 2019, three years since "Shelter". He then subsequently released two more singles in July and October and announced the release date for his album as 15 November 2019.

During Good Faith's production, Leclercq listened to a plethora of hip-hop music, as well as artists like Frank Ocean, Tyler, the Creator, Kraftwerk, and Pink Floyd, and states that their music gave inspiration for some of the production styles of the album. He also frequently cites Daft Punk and The Beatles as constant heavy influences on his songwriting and production, even before he began writing Good Faith.

== Recording ==
As Leclercq finished touring his Adventure album on the Pixel Empire Tour in early 2016, he stayed in a New York studio for three days to conceive concepts for a second studio album. He has stated that "Porter had heard some of the music I was writing and really liked it, and it kind of inspired us to make 'Shelter'". During production of "Shelter" and the Shelter Live Tour, Leclercq stated that he always had the intention to eventually produce Good Faith.

For his whole life, Leclercq had produced his music, including the entirety of Adventure and the beginnings of Good Faith, mainly out of his studio in his parents basement in Nantes. Leclercq also spent some time in Ålesund, Norway producing some of the album at Ocean Sound Recordings. While touring in 2018, he was playing a show in Los Angeles and decided to move to Hollywood Hills from France, relocating his studio as well.

Leclercq has sole production, mixing, and mastering credit for all songs on the album. He states that the writing and production of the album was mostly a solitary effort, as only two of the songs have a co-writer. Leclercq would "sometimes [try] to grab something" from a collaborator, like an instrumental performance or a vocal recording.

After releasing two of the leading singles off of Good Faith, on 14 October 2019 Leclercq sent out an emotional letter to fans on his e-mail list and social media, opening up about his depression after performing a debut Good Faith Live show at Lollapalooza. He stated that he had put production and release of the album on hold to give himself time to recuperate and "be healthy".

== Composition ==
"I definitely tried to outgrow some of my previous production sensibility, which was, you know, informed by dance music... I keep everything that I loved about that and also embrace all my other influences."

— Leclercq, 2019

Leclercq selected the album title Good Faith several years prior to its release. He states that he enjoys both the "spiritual" and "candid, legal" interpretations of the title, and that he found both words to be profound and evocative of the idea behind the album.

Leclercq has stated although that he meant for the choirs and soul singers on the album to sound like they were taken from other songs, the album contains no use of sampling. Leclercq instead opted to record live choirs and solo gospel singers. In addition, he also recorded live drums and numerous live instruments. When recording his first and previous studio album Adventure, Leclercq provided vocals for three tracks. He has also spoken about how writing and performing the vocals for his and Porter Robinson's single "Shelter" caused him to want to stray away from having traditional features to lean more towards performing the vocals himself citing a wish for the album to feel like "more of an embodied artist project". Leclercq provides vocals for every song on Good Faith, aside from "Heavy With Hoping".

Good Faith takes inspiration from R&B, hip-hop, gospel, and funk music, while also being influenced by Leclercq's background producing nu-disco, French house, and EDM. He states he listened to artists that he adjectively describes as "so Good Faith": Tame Impala, Jamie xx, The Zombies, Anderson .Paak, Chance the Rapper, and the Weeknd.

=== Technical aspects ===
Leclercq is adept in various vocal processing techniques. He uses them throughout his past releases as well as in Good Faith. In many of the album's tracks, Leclercq most notably uses vocal chopping on R&B style vocals in "Dream Dream Dream", "Nirvana" and "Be Fine", as well as chopping his own vocals in "Miracle". Another technique carried over into the album from previous releases like "Shelter", "Beings", and "Zephyr", is Leclercq's liberal use of "formant shifting". This technique shifts peaks in a frequency spectrum to adjust the "openness" of the human voice. This causes Leclercq's voice to sound significantly more or less deep while still singing the same pitch. Leclercq also processes his voice using a pitch correction software to a more distinct degree in Good Faith than in "Shelter" or any tracks off of Adventure.

He also employs classic house music techniques like kick drum side-chaining, which is heavily used in "Mania". He also uses fast arpeggiation with little attack in most of the tracks to add "flutter". He utilizes classic nu-disco and French house style bass-lines, clap patterns, and synth sounds, reminiscent of Leclercq's signature sound from previous releases as exemplified in "No Fear No More" and "All My Friends".

=== Themes ===
I wanted my "joy" album. Through the process of making it, initially, it can be a fairly superficial pursuit — just making stuff about "joy." As you start to question where it comes from, you find the depth, the substance. It became more meaningful to me because it became more about earning my joy rather than just describing it. Making the album these past three years has been difficult with some really low points. Re-earning my joy through introspection has been a real journey.

— Leclercq in a Paper interview, 2019

Good Faith consists of ten tracks. This is significantly less than his previous album, but Leclercq defends this by saying that he thinks of the ten tracks and surrounding production more like an era than an album. He says that, even after the album's release, "there'll be more Good Faith."

Leclercq says that the theme of the album is about a person's love, questioning, and relationship to reality, and the validity of emotion with the benefit of positive hindsight. He also has said that his mood, mental health and questioning his own joy and enthusiasm have been heavy themes that he wanted to impress into the album.

Similarly to what he did with Adventure, Leclercq makes a point to hide messages, objects, and code into his album designs and songs, in order to make something that's "worth being a fan of". This was exemplified best during the release of the limited edition "All My Friends" vinyl record at specific record stores in the cities in which he had spent time producing Good Faith. This was meant as a scavenger hunt for fans, as he did not specify where the record stores were, and only had eight records pressed, two per store.

=== Songs ===
The second track on the album, "All My Friends", was released as the first single in May 2019. Leclercq states that, of the whole album, "All My Friends" is "the most directly and structurally pop song. It's a fun statement to start a campaign with the most confidently pop song." Leclercq considers the track to be an homage to all of his favorite pop music. He compares the release of this track as the first single of Good Faith to fellow French DJ/producers Daft Punk's release of "One More Time", the first single off of 2001's Discovery.

Leclercq has said that some tracks, like "Dream Dream Dream" were completed early on during production of the album, but held off on releasing them in order to connect all aspects of the album thematically and under one vision.

=== Art ===
Leclercq began planning and designing art for Good Faith as early as 2015. The final artwork is a filtered photo of Leclercq. The filter is a photo negative that has its highlights color shifted to green, mid-tones shifted blue, and shadows shifted red. This filter is also used on many of the promotional art, music videos, and single cover art for Good Faith, sometimes varying the colors and shifting between a photo negative and photo positive.

== Promotion ==
=== Music videos ===
After the release of each single, Leclercq uploaded both an official audio video and an official music video to his YouTube channel. On 30 July 2020, Leclercq released a video for "Miracle" starring Maisie Williams and directed by Lena Headey.

=== Singles ===
On 29 May 2019 Leclercq released a preview of "All My Friends", his first single since "Shelter". This preview was released through a new website, goodfaith.world, which contained a video that played the song, along with locations of record stores in four cities: Los Angeles, New York, Ålesund, and Nantes. Each record store was issued two copies of the new single on clear 7" vinyl. On 30 May 2019, the full official audio was released on YouTube.

=== Good Faith Radio ===
On 10 July 2019, Leclercq premiered the first episode of Good Faith Radio (Beats 1 Radio on Apple Music), where he debuted Good Faith's second single, "Dream Dream Dream", and played tracks by other artists, including music sent by his fans accompanied by fan-made art. He described the radio show as "...a space I want us to share, I want to introduce you to my favorite things and showcase some of the amazing music and art you create." Along with the radio premiere, "Dream Dream Dream" was released on music streaming platforms and a visualizer video was released on YouTube.

=== Good Faith Live Tour ===
In mid-2019, Leclercq announced that his live show, dubbed Good Faith Live, would debut at Lollapalooza 2019, along with new music. He stated in an interview that he had been writing the album and creating the Good Faith Live show simultaneously, and he wanted the debut of his new show to have an appropriately sized production. It was later revealed his supporting lineup consisted of ford., LP Giobbi, Devault, Ilo Ilo, Giraffage, Flamingosis, and Instupendo.

The show consists of Leclercq performing alone on stage triggering samples, playing keys, drums, and singing, while accompanied by themed visuals loosely inspired by the types used in the Shelter Live Tour. He announced that the first show at Lollapalooza would be followed by shows in London, Amsterdam, and Paris. A longer North American leg began in October 2019 in Vancouver and ended on 14 December in Austin, Texas, a total of 31 shows. This will be followed by an Australian tour as part of FOMO Festival in January 2020.

== Reception ==
A review of the album from Magnetic Magazine praised the album, stating "this new album is a step in a new direction that feels more organic and authentic to Madeon. Good Faith is his best work yet and what a way to cap off a decade that has seen him grow from a teenager working out of his parents' home in Nantes to a festival headliner and universally loved dance act." An article from London newspaper Evening Standard negatively assessed his use of pitch correction, stating he is "using his voice more like a synth". The article also opined that the album lacked originality and that Leclercq sounded like a producer that was "still finding his own voice".

The album was nominated for Best Electronic Album for the 2021 Grammy Awards.

== Track listing ==
All tracks are written by Hugo Pierre Leclercq. "Hold Me Just Because" is co-written by James Alan Ghaleb and "Heavy with Hoping" is co-written by Audra Mae.

Good Faith track listing
No.	Title	Length
1.	"Dream Dream Dream"	3:54
2.	"All My Friends"	3:24
3.	"Be Fine"	3:28
4.	"Nirvana"	2:32
5.	"Mania"	2:32
6.	"Miracle"	4:10
7.	"No Fear No More"	3:15
8.	"Hold Me Just Because"	3:06
9.	"Heavy with Hoping"	4:01
10.	"Borealis"	4:45
Total length:		35:07

Notes

- All songs produced, arranged, mixed and feature vocals by Hugo Leclercq.
- "All My Friends" features additional vocals from Jackson Dean, bass guitar from Jake Bowman, guitar and additional programming from Alex Al, Rob Harris, Hal Ritson, and Richard Adlam, engineering by Tom Norris, and additional piano from Al.
- "Be Fine", "Mania" and "Miracle" feature vocals from Callie Day.
- "Nirvana" features vocals from Elroy "Spoonface" Powell and additional programming from Richard Adlam and Hal Ritson.
- "No Fear No More" features vocals from the West Los Angeles Children's Choir.
- "Hold Me Just Because" features contributions from James the Human and Brasstracks.
- "Heavy with Hoping" features vocals from Audra Mae.
- "Borealis" features steel guitar by B. J. Cole.

== Charts ==
Chart performance for Good Faith
Chart (2019–2020)	Peak position
Japanese Albums (Oricon)	185
US Billboard 200	82
US Top Dance Albums (Billboard)	1

Five tracks from Good Faith charted on the US Billboard Hot Dance/Electronic Songs chart:

- "All My Friends" peaked at number 16.
- "Be Fine" peaked at 30.
- "No Fear No More" peaked at 36.
- "Dream Dream Dream" peaked at 37.
- "Miracle" peaked at 38.

== Release history ==
Release history and formats for Good Faith
Region	Date	Format(s)	Label	Ref.
Various	15 November 2019	CD; digital download; streaming; vinyl	Columbia	
Japan	15 January 2020	CD	SMEJ	
