= Robotaki =

Canadian music producer

- Birth name: Preston Anthony Chin
- Born: July 21, 1991 (age 33); Toronto, Ontario, Canada
- Origin: Montreal, Quebec, Canada
- Genres: Electronic dance music
- Occupations: DJ; producer
- Instrument: Digital audio workstation
- Years active: 2013–present
- Labels: Majestic Casual; Next Wave Records; Monstercat; Foreign Family Collective; Moving Castle

Preston Anthony Chin (born July 21, 1991), better known by his stage name Robotaki, is a Canadian DJ and producer, based in Montreal, Quebec.

== Early life ==
Based in Montreal, Chin has a Master's degree in genetics, from McGill University. Born in Toronto, Chin began using the stage name Robotaki, a derivation from the grilled Japanese food robatayaki.

== Career ==
In 2013, he self-released the song "It's Still About You" featuring Chicago-based group Hey Champ and Sean Kirk better known as DJ SK . In 2015, Robotaki remixed Strange Talk's "Painted in Gold". In 2016, he produced an official remix of The Chainsmokers' single "Closer". It was described by Billboard as their "favorite interpretation" with a sophisticated synth update of the song.

Touring as the opener for Madeon's and Porter Robinson's Shelter Live Tour, Robotaki said "One of the most positive and inspiring experiences of my life... I’ve learned so much and met so many new fans... It's been such a blessing to be on the road with these guys." He released his debut single, titled "Ghostboy" featuring Claire Ridgely, on Majestic Casual Records. The song received international acclaim on major streaming platforms and peaked at 5th on the Viral Charts of United States, United Kingdom, and Germany. Later that year, he released "Right Time" as a single.

A song titled "Automaton", was released by Robotaki, through Monstercat. He released remixes of Porter Robinson and Madeon's "Shelter", Kaskade's "Whatever", Goldroom's "Lying To You" and Mansionair's "Speak Easy". In July 2017, he collaborated with Manila Killa for the single "I Want You". Robotaki's second collaboration with vocalist Claire Ridgely "Monkey Bars", was released via Majestic Casual Recordings. An instrumental remix of Chilly Gonzales' "You Can Dance" was released by Robotaki.

== Discography ==
=== Singles ===
Title	Year
"Ghostboy"	2016
"Right Time"	2016
"Automaton"	2017
"Drunk"	2017
"Monkey Bars"	2017
"I Want You"	2017
"Together We're Screwed"	2018
"Limbo"	2018
"Butterscotch"	2018
"Brooklyn '95"	2018
"All I Can Do"	2019
"Meant To Be"	2019

== Remixes ==
- Daft Punk - "Derezzed" (Robotaki Remix)
- Chilly Gonzales - "You Can Dance" (Robotaki Remix)
- Awolnation - "I'm on Fire" (Robotaki Remix)
- Girls' Generation - "Hoot" (Robotaki Remix)
- The Chainsmokers featuring Halsey - "Closer" (Robotaki Remix)
- Kavinsky - "Nightcall" (Robotaki Remix)
- Hayley Kiyoko - "I Wish" (Robotaki Remix)
