= Holy Ship! =

Music festival

- Genre: Electronic dance music, house music, Bass, Dubstep
- Dates: January, sometimes February
- Locations: Punta Cana, Dominican Republic, Riviera Maya, Mexico
- Years active: 2012-present
- Website: http://www.holyship.com/

Holy Ship! is an annual electronic dance music (EDM) festival previously held aboard a 4,000+ capacity cruise ship, with two back to back sailings leaving out of Port Canaveral, Florida with stops in the Bahamas. It was originally set up by Destructo and eventually absolved by Insomniac Records after infighting. The event is put on by music production companies Cloud 9 Adventures, HARD, and The Bowery Presents.

Holy Ship! was cancelled in 2021 due to the COVID-19 pandemic. It returned in January 2022, but instead of a cruise ship the entire festival took place at the Hard Rock Resort in Riviera Maya. All subsequent events have taken place on land.

== Cruises (2012–2019) ==
Before 2020, when Holy Ship! took place in a cruise ship, the festival was split into two back-to-back trips on the same route. The cruise would start from Port Canaveral and travel to the Bahamas, making a stop on a private island for an all-day beach party. From there it would either spend a day at sea, or stop in Nassau, then ultimately return to Cape Canaveral.

The private island party features a daytime dance party, with a lineup of DJs performing and an un-announced artist arriving by helicopter. Historically, the event sold out in the pre-booking phase, in which previous guests received a token and were allowed to book prior to ticket sales opening to the general public.

Previous headliners for the festival cruise include Skrillex, Knife Party, A-Trak, Zedd, Flume, Boys Noize, Rusko, Steve Aoki, Fatboy Slim, and Pretty Lights. Special guest appearances include Pharrell Williams, Kaskade, Disclosure, and Tiësto. In addition to music, the event hosts a variety of artist-led activities and workshops.

== Non-profit division ==
The non-profit division of Holy Ship!, Positive Legacy, holds a silent auction during the event, in which the proceeds are donated to current Positive Legacy service projects. Positive Legacy is a 501(c)(3) charity organization committed to integrating live music and service by taking actions that positively impact people and the environment in the communities they visit. In addition to the auction, Positive Legacy also offers guests the chance to offset their carbon emissions from traveling on the cruise, as well as holding a donation drive for the Bahamas Children's Emergency Hostel in Nassau.

== History ==
=== Holy Ship! Wrecked 2023 ===
Dates: December 12–16, 2023

Location: Riviera Maya, Mexico

Lineup: 1991, 4B, Ardalan, Austeria, Boys Noize, Cassian, Chanel Tres (DJ Set), Chris Lake, Chris Lorenzo, Claude VonStroke, Cloonee, Craze, Culture Shock, Dave Zilla, Derrick Carter, Dirt Monkey, DJ Dials, Dombresky, Fun2BJane, Get Real, GG Magree, Green Velvet, Hamdi, Heidi Lawren, Honeyluv, Justin Jay, Justin Martin, Lee Reynolds, Lubelski, Luuk van Dijk, Marbs, Mary Droppinz, Matroda, Mau P, Mija, Mikey Lion, Ms. Mada, Nikki Nair, Odd Mob, Porky, Prunk, Ranger Trucco, Rinzen, Rochelle Jordan, Rossi., San Pancho, Sippy, Skream, So Tuff So Cute, Sub Focus, Subtronics, The Knocks (DJ set), Thee Mike B, Tokimonsta, Troyboi, Valentino Khan, Wax Motif, Wreckno, Yotto

Featured parties: 4 Tha Luv, Ardy Pardy, Black Book Records, Cyclops Recordings, Desert Hearts, Hellbent Records, High Power, House of Wax, PIV Records, Young Art Records

=== Holy Ship! Wrecked 2021 ===
In 2021 the festival was held on land for the second time from December 3 to 7 at the Hard Rock Resort in Riviera Maya, Mexico.

=== Holy Ship! Wrecked 2020 ===
In 2020 the festival was held on land during Jan 22–26 in Punta Cana, Dominican Republic.

=== Holy Ship! Jan 10-13 2018 (2 of 2, 11.0) ===
Dates: January 10–13, 2018

Vessel: Norwegian Epic

Ports: Port Canaveral; Great Stirrup Cay

Lineup: AC SLATER, ALISON WONDERLAND, J. WORRA, SNAILS, JUDGE, JAUZ, LATMUN, 4B, JACK BEATS, PHLEGMATIC DOGS, KRANE, WORTHY, JUSTIN MARTIN, NANCY WHANG, MALL GRAB, CUT SNAKE, THEE MIKE B, REZZ, CHRIS LAKE, GLADIATOR, LOUIS FUTON, TAIKI NULIGHT, COOKIE MONSTA, JOYRYDE, SOLARDO, MIND AGAINST, VOLAC, FISHER, GTA, DION TIMMER, TESTPILOT, MADAM X, LOUDPVCK, ASTRONOMAR, NGHTMRE, KIM ANN FOXMAN, WHAT SO NOT, GRAVES, CRANKDAT, VALENTINO KHAN, EKALI, EXCISION, MR. CARMACK, GINA TURNER, GREEN VELVET, SLANDER, NOISIA, ARDALAN, PEGGY GOU, SAGE ARMSTRONG, VINDATA, DOMBRESKY, SUBSET, THE BLACK MADONNA, CHRISTIAN MARTIN, CHRIS LORENZO, 12TH PLANET

=== Holy Ship! Jan 6-10 2018 (1 of 2, 10.0) ===
Dates: January 6–10, 2018

Vessel: Norwegian Epic

Ports: Port Canaveral; Great Stirrup Cay

Lineup: AC SLATER, COYU, A-TRAK, REDLIGHT, CATZ 'N DOGZ, JOSH PAN, LOUIS THE CHILD, WALKER & ROYCE, MIJA, MALAA, KASKADE, KAYZO, GG MAGREE, JUSTIN MARTIN, YOTTO, BIG WILD, JUBILEE, JODY WISTERNOFF, AMTRAC, UNIIQU3, CHRIS LAKE, GODDOLLARS & PARADISE, MOON BOOTS, PARKER, WOLF + LAMB, JUSTIN CAY'S FANTASTIC VOYAGE, NICK MONACO, BORN DIRTY, CLAUDE VONSTROKE, GORGON CITY, GOLF CLAP, QRION, KITTENS, EPROM, SOUL CLAP, KEVIN SAUNDERSON, YULTRON, TENSNAKE, GINA TURNER, TCHAMI, YEHME2, WILL CLARKE, NOISIA, MEDASIN, FLAMINGOSIS, ROBOTAKI, BRANCHEZ & BIG WET, HOTEL GARUDA, GHASTLY, INFINITY INK, MK, MERCER, SUBSET, LINE 8, BAAUER, PARTY FAVOR, MANILA KILLA, LUTTRELL

Special Guest: Virtual Self

=== Holy Ship! Jan 2017 (2 of 2, 9.0) ===
Dates: January 10–14, 2017 (9.0)

Vessel: Norwegian Epic

Ports: Port Canaveral; Great Stirrup Cay, Nassau, Bahamas

Lineup: Fatboy Slim, GRiZ, Claude VonStroke, Jauz, Maya Jone Coles, Hot Since 82, GTA, Gorgon City (DJ Set), Destructo, Getter, Justin Martin, Jack Beats, Felix Da Housecat, Mija, AC Slater, DJ Tennis, Slow Magic, Hannah Wants, Soul Clap, Motez, Chris Lorenzo, Wolf+Lamb, Ookay, Slushii, Herobust, Wax Motif, J. Phlip, Thugfucker, Giraffage, Justin Jay, Rezz, Hucci, Gerd Janson, Oshi, Doorly, Party Favor, Craze, Gina Turner, Kim Ann Foxman, Bot, Barclay Crenshaw, Kidnap Kid, Horse Meat Disco, Cut Snake, DJ Doc Martin, Stranger, Nick Monaco, Jerry Folk, Redlight, Golf Clap, Josh Pan, Newcleus (Live), Vincent, Marques Wyatt, Mr. Kool Aid, Bones, Dateless, Subset, and The Interns.

=== Holy Ship! Jan 2017 (1 of 2, 8.0) ===
Dates: January 6–10, 2017 (8.0)

Vessel: Norwegian Epic

Ports: Port Canaveral; Great Stirrup Cay, Nassau, Bahamas

Lineup: DJ Snake, Tchami, Duke Dumont, Boys Noize, A-Trak, Marshmello, Big Gigantic, Rudimental (DJ Set), Kill The Noise, Destructo, Justin Martin, NGHTMRE, Jai Wolf, Snails, Rüfüs Du Sol, Bob Moses, Busy P, Anna Lunoe, Malaa, Mercer, Slander, Louis The Child, Troyboi, Totally Enormous Extinct Dinosaurs (DJ Set), Wax Motif, Jimmy Edgar, Danny Daze, Ghastly, Shiba San, Jonas Rathsman, Stwo, Amtrac, Kastle, Nina Las Vegas, Joyryde, Curses, Louisahhh!, Hotel Garuda, Ardalan, Drezo, Unlike Pluto, Gina Turner, Spank Rock Vs. Lil Internet, Djedjotronic, Christian Martin, Rory Phillips, Will Clarke, KaneHoller, Point Point, Manila Killa, Mambo Brothers, Sita Abellan, Kaz James, Aazar, Nvoy, Jstjr, Cardopusher, Gunslinger, Cameron Graham, Dena Amy, Bones, The Interns, and DJ Black Frames.

=== Holy Ship! February 2016 tree (7.0) ===
Dates: February 10–13, 2016

Vessel: MSC Divina

Ports: Miami, FL; Grand Bahama Island, Bahamas

Lineup: DJ Snake, Chromeo, Porter Robinson, RL Grime B2B Baauer, Boys Noize, Flux Pavilion, Tchami, What So Not, Cashmere Cat, Justin Martin, Thomas Jack, Destructo, Gramatik, Snakehips, Jauz, Gaslamp Killer, Shiba San, Felix Da Housecat, Branchez, Trippy Turtle, DJ Tennis, Claptone, Mercer, Busy P, Soul Clap, DJ Dodger Stadium, Oliver, Alex Metric, Thugfucker, Anna Lunoe, J. Phlip, Jimmy Edgar, The M Machine, Danny Daze, Carmada, Wolf + Lamb, Coyu, Mija, Marshmello, Justin Jay, Jets, Ardalan, Will Clarke, SNBRN, Nina Las Vegas, Samo Sound Boy, Machinedrum, Hunter Siegel, Falcons, Reflex, Malaa, Rezz, Cory Enemy, Kittens, Vanilla Ace, Hoodboi, Thee Cool Cats, Kaz James, Promnite

=== Holy Ship! Jan 2016 (6.0) ===
Dates: January 3–6, 2016

Vessel: MSC Divina

Ports: Miami, FL; Coco Cay, Bahamas

Lineup: Kaskade, Dillon Francis, Flosstradamus, Odesza, Steve Aoki, Robin Schulz, Tommy Trash, Griz, Rudimental (DJ set), Gorgon City (DJ set), Hudson Mohawke, Brodinski, Justin Martin, Destructo, MK, GTA, Bakermat (DJ set), Jack Beats, Kill the Nosie, Jackmaster, Ryan Hemsworth, Rustie, Valentino Khan, Lee Foss, Skream, Mr. Carmack, Slow Magic, Hannah Wants, Motez (producer), Djemba, Djemba, Lane 8, Peking Duk, Wax Motif, Patrick Topping, Riva Starr, AC Slater, Tommy Kruise, Doorly, Jai Wolf, Wiwek, Cruses, AWE, Louisahhh!!!, Soy Sauce, Royal, Bot, Genghis Clan, Slumberjack, Brazzabelle, Eyes Everywhere, Billy Kenny, Penthouse Penthouse

=== Holy Ship! Feb 2015 (5.0) ===
Dates: February 18–21, 2015

Vessel: MSC Divina

Ports: Miami, FL; Nassau, Bahamas; Grand Bahama Island, Bahamas

Note: This was the first year that Holy Ship hosted two sailings and cabin selection was opened up to the general public via a lottery system. This was also the first sailing to be held in February.

Lineup: Skrillex, Fatboy Slim, Baauer, DJ Snake, Tommy Trash, Basement Jaxx (DJ set), Claude Vonstroke, Ty Dolla $ign, DJ Mustard, Jack Beats, Busy P, Green Velvet, Sub Focus, Mat Zo, Breakbot, Brodinski, Destructo, Justin Martin, Alex Metric, Galantis, Cajmere, Tchami, AraabMuzik, Martin Buttrich, Lee Foss Feat. Anabel Englund, Soul Clap, Mercer, Huxley, The M Machine, J. Phlip, AC Slater, Kill Frenzy, Justin Jay, Milo & Otis, Valentino Khan, Louisahhh!!!, Curses, Boston Bun, Wax Motif, Kastle, Anna Lunoe, Club Cheval, Shift K3y, Panteros 666, So Me, Amtrac, DJ Pone, Sweater Beats, Tommy Kruise, Posso, Cut Snake. Special Guest: Kaskade

=== Holy Ship! Jan 2015 (4.0) ===
Dates: January 3–6, 2015

Vessel: MSC Divina

Note: This was the first year that Holy Ship hosted two sailings and cabin selection was opened up to the general public via a lottery system.

Ports: Miami, FL; Coco Cay, Bahamas; Day at Sea
Lineup: Knife Party, Pretty Lights, Flume, Boys Noize, A-Trak, RL Grime, Maya Jane Coles, Laidback Luke, Duke Dumont, Armand Van Helden, Rudimental (DJ set), What So Not, Clockwork, Busy P, Griz, Annie Mac, Justin Martin, Destructo, Alex Metric, Dusky, Odesza, Oliver, Rustie, Henry Fong, Gorgon City, Cyril Hahn, Salva, Jimmy Edgar, Congorock, Craze, Friend Within, Branchez, Spank Rock, DJ Sliink, Shiba San, Sharam Jey, Snakehips, DJ Falcon, Kidnap Kid, Hannah Wants, Motez, Teki Latex, Gina Turner, Wax Motif, Ape Drums, Doorly, Djedjotronic, Vanilla Ace, Cory Enemy, Yogi. Special Guest: Disclosure

=== Holy Ship!!! (3.0) ===
Dates: January 9–12, 2014
Vessel: MSC Divina
Ports: Miami, FL; Coco Cay, Bahamas
Lineup: Skrillex, Duck Sauce, Diplo, Boys Noize, Zedd, Laidback Luke, A-Trak, Zeds Dead, Dillon Francis, Baauer, Chromeo (DJ set), Disclosure (DJ set), Armand Van Helden, Claude VonStroke, Flosstradamus, Skream, Flume, RL Grime, Brodinksi, Crookers, Alvin Risk, Destructo, Justin Martin, Clockwork, GTA, Alex Metric, Oliver, Breach, Just Blaze, Griz, Gramatik, Ryan Hemsworth, Cyril Hahn, Djedjotronic, Strip Steve, TJR, Kill Frenzy, Amine Edge & Dance, French Fries, Gorgon City, Gina Turner, Green Lantern, Light Year, T. Williams, Jerome LOL, Samo Sound Boy, Katyranada, Liquid Todd. Special Guest Pharrell Williams

=== Holy Ship!! (2.0) ===
Dates: January 4–7, 2013

Vessel: MSC Poesia

Ports: Ft. Lauderdale, FL; Nassau, Bahamas; Private Island, Bahamas

Lineup: Justice (DJ set), Boys Noize, Knife Party, Major Lazer, Diplo, A-Trak, Skream & Benga, Busy P, Jack Beats, Zedd, Crookers, 12th Planet, Dillon Francis, Tommy Trash, Digitalism (DJ set), Breakbot, Gesaffelstein, Brodinski, Kill The Noise, Alvin Rush, Claude VonStroke, Justin Martin, Big Gigantic, Destructo, Oliver, Eats Everything, L-Vis 1990, Bok Bok, J. Phlip, Jackmaster, Plastician, Girl Unit, Kingdom, Gina Turner, Rory Phillips, The Knocks. Special Guest: Skrillex

=== Holy Ship! (1.0) ===
Dates: January 6–9, 2012

Vessel: MSC Poesia

Ports: Ft. Lauderdale, FL; Port Lucaya, Bahamas; Private Island, Bahamas

Lineup: Fatboy Slim, Boys Noize, Laidback Luke, Rusko, Diplo, A-Trak, Steve Aoki, Skrillex, Tommy Lee & DJ Aero, Brodinski, Buraka Som Sistema, Gesaffelstein, Justin Martin, Zedd, DJ Craze, Dillon Francis, Housemister, Strip Steve, Djedjotronic, Destructo, Danny Brown, Egyptrixx, Rory Phillips, Club Cheval, Jason Bentley, Posso, Doorly, Oliver, Gina Turner, Nick Catchdubs, Arthur Baker, Contra, Mike Deuce, Blu Jemz, Lloydski.

== See also ==
- List of festivals in Florida
- List of electronic music festivals
