= Metropolis Part I =

EP by The M Machine
- Released: April 24, 2012
- Recorded: 2011–2012
- Genre: Electro house, drumstep, synthpop, synthwave
- Length: 25:03
- Label: Owsla
- Producer: The M Machine

The M Machine chronology
Metropolis Part I (2012)	Metropolis Part II (2013)

Metropolis Part I is an EP by American electronic music trio The M Machine. It was released on April 24, 2012, and is the first part of a two-part concept album describing the story of a dystopian city known as Metropolis, as described by the digital liner notes available on their website. It was released on Owsla. The songs "A King Alone" and "Faces" feature vocals from the band members, while "Shadow in the Rose Garden" features vocals from Kelly Koval, which themselves are sampled from their earlier song "Promise Me a Rose Garden".

== Plot ==
A young boy, Milo, travels to the futuristic city of Metropolis, hoping to start a new life, but instead finds it to be an industrial dystopia, where workers work in factories to provide power for the King of Metropolis. ("Immigrants") The King has built a machine, called the M Machine, meant to pacify the citizens of the city and bring peace to Metropolis. ("A King Alone") In one factory, Milo works in the same place as Luma, a young woman who works on an assembly line and has resigned herself to her factory work. In a sudden moment of rebellion, Luma tries to convince the workers that there is a way to overthrow the King, which stops the entire assembly line process and causes the administration to kill multiple factory workers, including Milo. ("Faces") Luma takes the opportunity to escape the factory. ("Shadow in the Rose Garden")

Meanwhile, three men, the Brothers of Wisdom, infiltrate the caverns of Metropolis in order to obtain control of the M Machine. ("Deep Search") After braving multiple threats, they come face-to-face with a giant spider and are last seen fighting it to get to the Machine. ("Black")

== Track listing ==
All tracks are written by Andy Coenen, Ben Swardlick and Eric Luttrell

Track listing
No.	Title	Length
1.	"Immigrants"	4:52
2.	"Deep Search"	4:37
3.	"A King Alone"	3:46
4.	"Faces"	2:49
5.	"Black"	5:47
6.	"Shadow in the Rose Garden"	3:08

== Reception ==
"Metropolis Part I" was met with mostly positive reviews. Hit the Floor praised the record as a "breath of fresh air in the current music landscape where things can get very repetitive", while In Your Speakers stated "The incredible element of this is the concepts manifested in the songs are also concrete metaphors, allowing the abstract sounds to resemble and inspire their physical counterparts, making the world come alive in a way that is rare even for written words".

Metropolis Part I
Review scores
Source	Rating
In Your Speakers	83/100
Hit the Floor	8.5/10
