= Assumptions (song) =

2022 synth-pop song

Single by Sam Gellaitry

from the EP IV
- Released: 13 May 2021
- Recorded: 2019–2021
- Genre: Synth-pop
- Length: 3:40
- Label: FFRR
- Songwriter: Sam Gellaitry
- Producer: Sam Gellaitry

Sam Gellaitry singles chronology
"Name to a Face" (2022)	"Assumptions" (2021)	"Darling Drive" (2024)

"Assumptions" is a song written, produced, and performed by Scottish musician Sam Gellaitry. Originally released in 2021 on the IV EP, the song had a resurgence in popularity in 2025 thanks to its use in a viral video featuring Russian dancer Ruslan Aidaev, also known as "Blue Shirt Guy". The song peaked at number 5 on the Hot Dance/Electronic Songs chart in Billboard. The song was also featured as part of the pre-intro of Apple's WWDC 2025, held on June 9, 2025.

"Assumptions" was originally produced in 2019. In an interview with Billboard, Gellaitry stated that it was "six takes of breathy and high-register shit." In 2021, American producer Yung Bae featured the song in his mix on Triple J. In 2023, producer Kaytranada remixed "Assumptions". Gellaitry described Kaytranada as "a true innovator and inspiration to my music".

== Charts ==
Chart (2025)	Peak position
US Hot Dance/Electronic Songs (Billboard)	5
