= Victory (Madeon album) =

Studio album by Madeon
- Released: June 26, 2026
- Recorded: Late 2024 – March 26, 2026
- Studios: Architects HQ; Big Mercy Sound (Brooklyn, New York, NY) (Note: Tracks 1–4, 6–8, and 10)
- Genres: New rave, electropop
- Length: 31:56
- Label: Mom + Pop
- Producer: Madeon

Madeon chronology
Good Faith (2019)	Victory (2026)

Singles from Victory
- 1. "Hi!" Released: September 26, 2025; 2. "Car Crash Baby" Released: November 21, 2025; 3. "Fire Away" Released: April 30, 2026; 4. "Red Jacket" Released: May 29, 2026

Victory is the third studio album by French DJ and record producer Madeon, released on 26 June 2026 through Mom + Pop Music. The album features contributions and vocals from Slayyyter, Sam Gellaitry, and Erick the Architect. The album was promoted by four singles: "Hi!", "Car Crash Baby", "Fire Away", and "Red Jacket". Victory is influenced by various genres such as punk, with worldbuilding drawing from sci-fi and high fashion.

== Background and development ==
Leclercq started looking for a new direction to take his music in the years following the release of his sophomore album Good Faith (2019). Leclercq found inspiration for his next album following a breakup in late 2024, and quickly made Victory between the breakup and early 2025. Following the conclusion of the Good Faith Forever tour, Madeon took a hiatus from releasing solo studio material, instead focusing on collaborations and production work throughout 2024. In March 2025, he announced a headline performance at Red Rocks Amphitheatre, where he revealed he would debut a new live production and music from his next album. Before announcing Victory, Leclercq scrapped an album he had been working on earlier.

== Promotion and release ==
In March 2025, Leclercq announced a show at Red Rocks Amphitheatre in October to introduce his next era, where he introduced the Victory live show. A week before the show, the first single from the album, "Hi!", was released following an event in Los Angeles to tease his new era of music; Leclercq's decision to make "Hi!" the lead single from the album was made after receiving positive feedback on the song from his friend and fellow electronic producer Porter Robinson. "Hi!" marked a shift from the sound of Leclercq's previous work, incorporating sounds from rock and punk music.

"Car Crash Baby" was released on 21 November 2025 as the album's second single. The album's third single, "Fire Away" featuring Slayyyter, was released on 30 April 2026, after he debuted it at Coachella. Leclercq described the single as "perhaps the most anthemic record on the album". A week later, Leclercq announced a North American tour in support of the album spanning September to November 2026. The album's fourth single, "Red Jacket" featuring Sam Gellaitry was released a month later on 29 May 2026.

== Critical reception ==
Professional ratings
Review scores
Source	Rating
Pitchfork	6.8/10

Pitchfork staff likened the album to a "glittery car wreck that not only grabs your attention but demands you crank the stereo even louder"; Walden Green, a reviewer for the magazine, thought that "many of the choices on Victory appear straight-up corny, as opposed to tasteless on purpose". In an article for Esquire Philippines, JV Ordoñez wrote that the album "isn't for everyone, especially for some of his loyal fans" but described "Dancing On Your Grave" as "Madeon's best track in years" for Leclercq's "charismatic" and "powerful" vocals.

== Track listing ==
All tracks are written and produced by Hugo Pierre Leclercq, except where noted.

Victory track listing
No.	Title	Writer(s)	Producer(s)	Length
1.	"Hi!"			2:21
2.	"Car Crash Baby"		Leclercq; Tom Norris	3:17
3.	"Super Platinum" (featuring Erick the Architect)	Leclercq; Orlando Higginbottom; Erick Elliott	Leclercq; Higginbottom	2:31
4.	"Dancing On Your Grave"			3:59
5.	"Somebody Else"			3:13
6.	"Fire Away" (featuring Slayyyter)		Leclercq; Norris	3:27
7.	"Chaos Magic"			3:16
8.	"Enjoy"			3:00
9.	"Red Jacket" (featuring Sam Gellaitry)	Leclercq; Gellaitry		2:57
10.	"Lonely Space Age"	Leclercq; Higginbottom		3:50
Total length:				31:56

=== Notes ===
- "Hi!" contains a sample of "I Love L.A." by Randy Newman.
- "Super Platinum" contains a sample of "Robot Rock" by Daft Punk.
- "Fire Away" contains a sample of "Push It" by Salt-N-Pepa and "Right In" by Skrillex.
- "Enjoy" contains a sample of "Theme from the Planets" by Dexter Wansel.
