= Dog Blood =

Electronic dance music duo formed in 2012

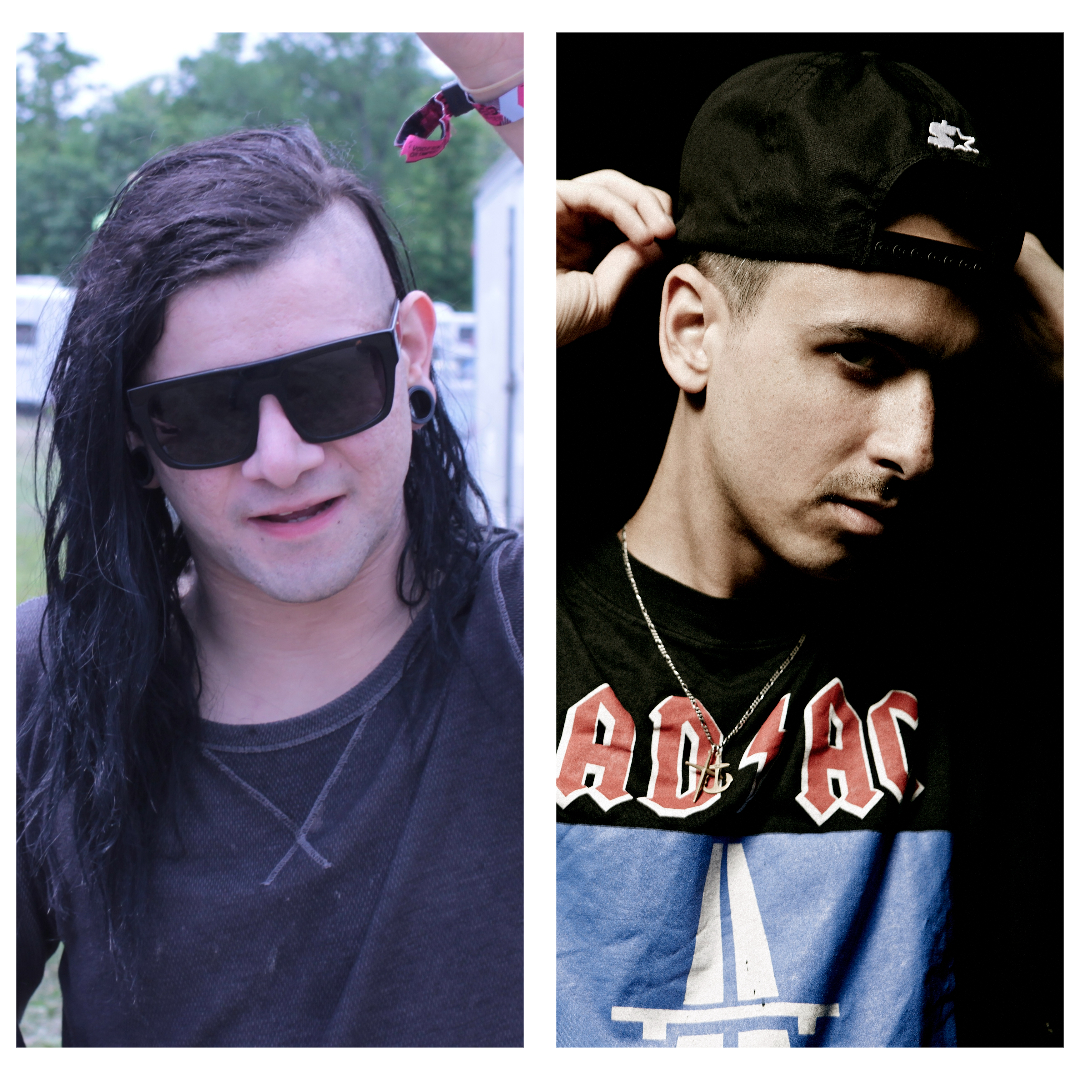
- Skrillex (left) and Boys Noize (right) of Dog Blood

Background information
- Genres: Electro house; deep house; trap
- Years active: 2012–present
- Labels: Big Beat; Owsla; Boysnoize
- Members: Skrillex; Boys Noize
- Website: owsla.com/artist/dog-blood

Dog Blood is a duo project of DJs and producers Skrillex and Boys Noize, formed in 2012. Their debut single, "Next Order" / "Middle Finger", was released on August 12, 2012, on Beatport and iTunes and other music streaming platforms. The song "Next Order" managed to reach #1 on Beatport's Techno chart.

On November 9, Dog Blood announced they were working on new material. Skrillex premiered a new Dog Blood track on an exclusive Owsla live stream to members of The Nest on December 21, 2012. On September 16, they released their second EP, which consists of the tracks "Shred or Die", "Middle Finger Pt. 2" and "Chella Ride". The EP is composed of a further two remixes of "Middle Finger" by The M Machine & Millions Like Us. The song "Chella Ride" peaked at #1 on the Beatport Breaks chart.

On March 17, Dog Blood performed live at Ultra Music Festival 2013 and debuted new material, including a remix of ASAP Rocky's "Wild For The Night". Dog Blood debuted their "Wild For The Night" remix along with three new songs. Information was released of an eight track remix package of their debut single Next Order/Middle Finger set to be released in late August, as well as a 5 track standard release coming out via The Nest subscription. Dog Blood performed at the Las Vegas Electric Daisy Carnival and Glastonbury Festival in Pilton, Somerset in June 2013. They also played a show on July 14 for the RBC Ottawa Bluesfest and made their Hard Summer debut on Saturday, August 3. On Skrillex's BBC Essential Mix 15/6/13, Skrillex premiered the new tracks "Dog Blood - Chella Ride", "A$AP Rocky - Wild For The Night (Dog Blood Remix)", and "Josh Wink - Higher State of Consciousness (Dog Blood Edit)".

On December 2, 2014, Boys Noize posted an image of Dog Blood themed artwork, hinting a potential third EP of new material. During the summer of 2014, they won the Best Animation Category in Berlin Music Video Awards, with the music video of Chella Song

On January 28, 2015, the lineup for the Detroit festival "Movement" was released. Included on the lineup was Dog Blood, marking a return after a cease of performances without explanation. The festival took place from May 23–25 2015.

Dog Blood performed at the 2017 Hard Summer Music Festival in Fontana, California on August 6. This was the only performance for Dog Blood in 2017.

Dog Blood returned to the stage in 2019, with a performance at BUKU Music + Art Project in New Orleans, Louisiana, on March 23. Dog Blood then traveled to Miami that same week to perform a warehouse party put on by Brownies & Lemonade on March 28 in Wynwood, Florida. They then played the next day at Ultra Music Festival on March 29 at the UMF Worldwide Stage, releasing a new song the day of and vowing to release future music. They played at Electric Zoo in New York City September 1, closing out the Main Stage.

== Discography ==
=== Extended plays ===
Title	Details	Track listing
"Next Order" / "Middle Finger"	Released: August 12, 2012; Label: OWSLA / Boysnoize Records; Formats: Digital download, vinyl	"Next Order"; "Middle Finger"
"Middle Finger Pt. 2"	Released: September 16, 2013; Label: OWSLA / Boysnoize Records; Formats: Digital download, vinyl	"Middle Finger Pt. 2"; "Chella Ride"; "Shred or Die"; "Middle Finger (The M Machine Remix)"; "Middle Finger Pt. 2 (Millions Like Us Remix)"; "Chella Ride (Mr. Oizo Remix)" (Note: Exclusive track from limited edition red vinyl in which "Middle Finger Pt. 2 (Millions Like Us Remix)" is omitted)
Turn Off the Lights	Released: May 31, 2019; Label: OWSLA / Boysnoize Records; Formats: Digital download, streaming	"Break Law"; "4 Mind" (with Josh Pan and X&G); "Kokoe" (with Otira); "Turn Off the Lights"

=== Singles ===
Year	Title	Label
2019	"Turn Off the Lights"	Owsla / Boysnoize Records / Atlantic Records
2019	"Midnight Hour" (featuring Ty Dolla $ign)	Owsla / Atlantic Records
2023	"Fine Day Anthem"	Owsla / Boysnoize Records / Atlantic Records

=== Remixes ===
Year	Title	Artist	Label
2013	"Wild for the Night" (featuring Skrillex and Birdy Nam Nam)	A$AP Rocky	Owsla / Nest
2019	"4 MIND" (featuring josh pan and X&G) - Good Times Ahead remix	Dog Blood	Owsla / Boysnoize Records / Atlantic Records
