= The City (EP) =

EP by Madeon
- Released: 8 October 2012
- Recorded: 2011–12
- Genre: Electro house
- Length: 23:37
- Labels: Popcultur; Columbia
- Producer: Madeon

Madeon chronology
The City (2012)	Adventure (2015)

Singles from The City
- 1. "Icarus" Released: 24 February 2012; 2. "Finale" Released: 22 July 2012; 3. "The City" Released: 27 August 2012

The City is an extended play (EP) by French DJ and record producer Madeon. The title track was released as a single on 27 August 2012, with an EP release on 8 October 2012, with remixes and alternative versions of his tracks "Finale" and "Icarus". It was released exclusively as a digital download. The EP's title track, "The City", contains uncredited vocals from Zak Waters and Cass Lowe, and an extended mix. A remix by The M Machine was released as a single on 10 December 2012. The song is on the soundtrack for the 2012 video game Need for Speed: Most Wanted and NHL 15. The song features on the deluxe edition of his debut studio album, Adventure (2015).

== Music video ==
A music video to accompany the release of "The City" was posted to YouTube on 18 September 2012. As of January 2023, it had received more than 6.5 million views.

== Track listing ==
Digital download – single
No.	Title	Length
1.	"The City"	3:53

Digital download – EP
No.	Title	Length
1.	"The City"	3:53
2.	"The City" (extended mix)	4:30
3.	"Finale" (Netsky remix)	4:55
4.	"Icarus" (live version)	5:09
5.	"Icarus" (Fred V & Grafix remix)	5:10

== Chart performance ==
Chart (2012)	Peak position
Belgium (Ultratip Bubbling Under Wallonia)	24
Belgium Dance (Ultratop Flanders)	34
Belgium (Ultratip Bubbling Under Wallonia)	21
Belgium Dance (Ultratop Wallonia)	25
Hungary (Rádiós Top 40)	13
UK Dance (Official Charts)	16
UK Singles (Official Charts Company)	74
US Hot Dance Club Songs (Billboard)	20

== Release history ==
Region	Date	Format	Label
United States	27 August 2012	Digital download	Popcultur; Columbia
United Kingdom	8 October 2012	Digital download	Popcultur; Columbia
