= Novation Launchpad =

Electronic music multi-button controller

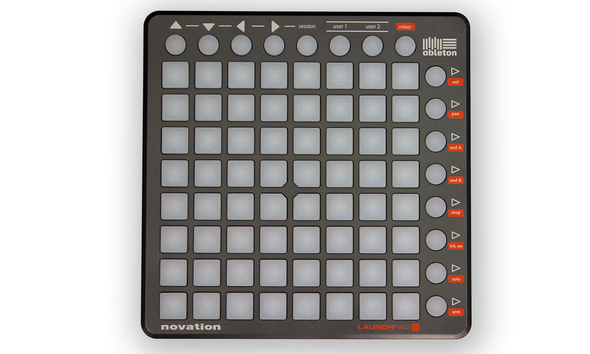
- Launchpad S model
- Product type: Electronic music multi-button controller
- Country: England
- Introduced: November 2, 2009; 17 years ago
- Website: https://novationmusic.com/en/launch

The Novation Launchpad is an electronic music multi-button controller for the popular live control application Ableton Live, featuring a grid of 64 (8×8) brightly illuminated square buttons. Each button can be assigned to a clip, (a piece of audio or MIDI that may or may not be looped). Additional modes allow Automap control of features and mixer control.

== Description ==
The Launchpad is an electronic music instrument with an 8×8 grid of 64 buttons/pads and made for Ableton Live. There are 9 different models of the Launchpad. Various pads allow users to launch clips, play drum racks, and create melodies. There are currently four different Launchpad models: Launchpad Mini, Launchpad X, Launchpad Pro, and Launchpad Control.

== Models ==
- Launchpad (2009) - The original version or the Launchpad, it is the first model and the most common/bought Launchpad product.
- Launchpad S (2013) - It is an updated and brighter version original Launchpad with faster flicker, response rate and brighter buttons.
- Launchpad Pro, Launchpad MkII, Launchpad Mini, and Launchpad Mini MkII (2015) - These models are other updated versions of the Launchpad. Launchpad Pro and Launchpad MkII introduce a new RGB feature, Launchpad Pro has velocity and aftertouch sensitivity, 16 more side buttons, and standalone external MIDI I/O mode, as well as a setup mode.
- Launchpad X (2019) - Updated version the launchpad Mk2 line-up, featuring 16 squared off edge buttons. the 64 main buttons which have become velocity and pressure sensitive. Released for the 10th anniversary of the Launchpad.
- Launchpad Pro Mk3, Launchpad Mini Mk3 (2020) - The Launchpad Mini Mk3 Has the same layout as the Launchpad X. Unlike previous versions of the Launchpad Mini, this one has RGB pads. The new Launchpad Pro Mk3 has 40 squared off edge buttons and two corner buttons on the left side. Both devices use USB-C type cables to connect and both come with a license to Ableton Live 10 Lite.

== Reception ==
The instrument has gained significant popularity online, especially on YouTube. It is often used to create cover songs, and has even served as a way of launching a career for some artists such as Madeon in his song "Pop Culture".
