= Icarus (Madeon song) =

Single by Madeon

from the EP The City and the album Adventure (deluxe edition)
- Released: 24 February 2012
- Recorded: 2011
- Length: 3:34
- Label: Popcultur; Columbia
- Songwriter: Hugo Pierre Leclercq
- Producer: Madeon

Madeon singles chronology
"Pop Culture" (2011)	"Icarus" (2012)	"Finale" (2012)

"Icarus" is a song performed by French DJ and record producer Madeon. It was released on 24 February 2012 as a digital download in the United Kingdom. Additionally, 500 copies of the extended mix were sold on vinyl records. The single entered the UK Singles Chart at number 22. The album art depicts Sydney, Australia's city skyline. The song features on the deluxe edition of his debut studio album, Adventure (2015).

== Track listing ==
Digital download
No.	Title	Length
1.	"Icarus"	3:34
2.	"Icarus" (extended mix)	4:09

== Chart performance ==
Chart (2012)	Peak position
Belgium (Ultratip Bubbling Under Flanders)	24
Belgium Dance (Ultratop Flanders)	24
Belgium Dance Bubbling Under (Ultratop Flanders)	16
Belgium Dance Bubbling Under (Ultratop Wallonia)	17
UK Singles (OCC)	22
UK Dance (OCC)	5
Scotland (OCC)	23

== Release history ==
Region	Date	Format	Label
United Kingdom	24 February 2012	12"; digital download	Popcultur; Columbia
