= All My Friends (Madeon song) =

Single by Madeon

from the album Good Faith
- Released: 31 May 2019
- Genre: Nu-disco; electropop
- Length: 3:24
- Label: Columbia
- Songwriter: Hugo Leclercq
- Producer: Madeon

Madeon singles chronology
"Shelter" (2016)	"All My Friends" (2019)	"Dream Dream Dream" (2019)

Music video
- "All My Friends" on YouTube

"All My Friends" is a song by French DJ and record producer Madeon, released on 31 May 2019 as the lead single from his second studio album Good Faith (2019). Vinyl copies were released earlier in four cities: Los Angeles and New York City in the United States, Ålesund in Norway, and Nantes in France. Two vinyls were in each location, for a total of eight vinyl copies, released two days before the streaming release of the song.

== Promotion ==
After promotional vinyl copies were released in four cities, Leclercq later said that all copies had been found and that the song would be "out everywhere Friday". At midnight on 31 May 2019, the song was released with generally good reception from the community.

== Reception ==
The website We Rave You opined that "'All My Friends' is a classic Madeon release, carrying his signature melodic synths and drum beats, but has a more poppy, commercial sound this time".

== Charts ==
Chart (2019)	Peak position
US Hot Dance/Electronic Songs (Billboard)	16
