= Shelter (Porter Robinson and Madeon song) =

Single by Porter Robinson and Madeon
- Released: August 11, 2016
- Genre: Synth-pop; future bass; J-pop; EDM
- Length: 3:39 (album version); 6:07 (video version)
- Label: Columbia; popcultur
- Songwriters: Hugo Leclercq; Porter Robinson
- Producers: Hugo Leclercq; Porter Robinson

Porter Robinson singles chronology
"Flicker" (2014)	"Shelter" (2016)	"Get Your Wish" (2020)

Madeon singles chronology
"Nonsense" (2015)	"Shelter" (2016)	"All My Friends" (2019)

Music video
- "Shelter" (video) on YouTube
- "Shelter" (audio) on YouTube

"Shelter" is a song by American DJ and record producer Porter Robinson and French DJ and record producer Madeon, released as a non-album single on August 11, 2016. In October 2016, a music video, produced in collaboration with A-1 Pictures, was released.

In support of the single, both Robinson and Madeon embarked on a joint tour, the Shelter Live Tour. The tour began September 29, 2016, with the final performance happening on April 23, 2017 at Coachella 2017.

== Background ==
Prior to beginning their professional music careers, Porter Robinson and Madeon met for the first time in a music production Internet forum when they were 14 and 12 years old, respectively. Recalling their past together, Robinson stated that at the time they met, "Neither of us had even a whimper of a music career obviously, and we were kind of rivals. We were both the young kids who were making music on that forum, and so we competed with each other." As their musical careers developed, the two continued to share music with each other. While developing a friendship, they each became successful independent of the other.

"Shelter" is Robinson and Madeon's only collaboration. Madeon stated, "Both Porter and I started working with people in-person when we started making our respective albums and appreciated how much more collaborative you can get... Our intent was to make music that would reflect our friendship." Robinson and Madeon have stated that they do not plan to continue collaborating after "Shelter". Explaining the decision, Madeon stated, "If we kept 'Shelter' going for too long, then the ways that our tastes don't fully overlap would become frustrating."

== Release ==
The song was released and uploaded to Madeon's YouTube channel on August 11, 2016. The song was released in the United States on Columbia Records and popcultur as a digital download, and on Spotify, Deezer, Apple Music, Google Play, and SoundCloud. "Shelter" was released together with an announcement that Robinson and Madeon would embark on the Shelter Live Tour in the US and Canada. Robinson confirmed on Twitter that the tour would feature both himself and Madeon playing simultaneously in live shows, beginning in late 2016.

On August 11, 2026, a limited-edition vinyl reissue of the single was announced to celebrate the tenth anniversary of its release. The vinyl includes the version of Madeon's song "Beings" performed during the Shelter Live Tour on its B-side.

== Composition ==
The track is three minutes and 39 seconds long and composed in the key of C major. The lead melody in the track is a processed, chopped-up vocal of a song previously recorded by Robinson during the production of Worlds, featuring Amy Millan. The lead vocal is provided by Madeon. The track takes elements from both artist's debut albums; Porter Robinson's Worlds, and Madeon's Adventure. The chopped up vocals are a signature sound of both artists, as seen in Robinson's single "Flicker", and Madeon's song "You're On" from Adventure. Madeon has stated that the lyrics are about his parents.

== Music video ==
A frame from the music video, depicting its main character, Rin, inside her simulated world

On October 14, 2016, Robinson announced on his Twitter account that he had spent over a year collaborating with Japanese animation studio A-1 Pictures on an animated music video for "Shelter". The video was released on October 18, 2016, on Robinson's YouTube channel in partnership with Crunchyroll. Robinson originally approached A-1 Pictures to make the video because it was the studio that created Anohana, an anime series that matches his sensibilities as an artist. Based on an original story written by Robinson, the video is produced in a short film format.

The video's plot follows 17-year-old Rin (voiced by Sachika Misawa) who lives alone inside a futuristic simulation. She maintains control of the simulation and the virtual world around her through a tablet on which she can draw scenes that the world around her will then create in a three-dimensional environment. She continues on like this for many years, living a peaceful but lonely life. All of a sudden, she experiences scenes before her that she hasn't created. As an invisible observer, Rin witnesses her life as a 7-year-old child living in Tokyo. Through a series of newsreels and images, it is learned that at this time a moon-sized planetary object is on a collision course with Earth. Rin's father Shigeru dedicates a large portion of his time to the happiness of his daughter, but in the meantime builds a single-passenger spacecraft with life support for Rin to escape. He also successfully wipes any memory of him or Earth from her mind, instead programming these and a letter from him to come to her later in life in the hope that she would better understand the circumstance once she has matured. Just before the planet makes contact, he connects her to the simulation and launches the ship carrying her into space, where she has been for the past ten years.

The video was broadcast on Toonami on December 31, 2016, making it their first in Japanese with English subtitles as opposed to with an English dub. However, the video is edited in the broadcast, as the subtitled parts were removed.

== Usage in media ==
This song was featured as soundtrack in the EA Sports game, FIFA 17.

== Reception ==
Music Times stated in an article that "'Shelter' is what fans of both artists have been hoping for. It manages to bring together the sounds of both artists – Porter Robinson and his synth wizardry found on Worlds and then similar shimmering synths that Madeon has used over the years."

== Charts and certifications ==
=== Weekly charts ===
Chart (2016)	Peak position
Belgium Dance (Ultratop Flanders)	30
Belgium Dance Bubbling Under (Ultratop Wallonia)	9
France (SNEP)	125
Japan Hot 100 (Billboard)	64
US Hot Dance/Electronic Songs (Billboard)	16
US Spotify Viral 50 (Billboard)	15

=== Year-end charts ===
Chart (2016)	Position
US Hot Dance/Electronic Songs (Billboard)	70

=== Certifications ===
Region	Certification	Certified units/sales
United States (RIAA)	Gold	500,000^{‡}
^{‡} Sales+streaming figures based on certification alone.

== Release history ==
Region	Date	Format	Label
United States	August 11, 2016	7-inch; digital download	Columbia; popcultur
