= Cut the Kid =

Single by Madeon

from the album Adventure (deluxe edition)
- Released: February 2014
- Recorded: 2011 or 2012
- Genre: Nu-disco; electro
- Length: 3:17
- Label: Popcultur; Columbia
- Songwriter: Hugo Pierre Leclercq
- Producer: Hugo Pierre Leclercq

Madeon singles chronology
"Technicolor" (2013)	"Cut the Kid" (2014)	"Imperium" (2014)

"Cut the Kid" is a song by French DJ and record producer Madeon. He described it as "kind of a happy groovy production jam". It was released as a free download in February 2014 through Madeon's website. Madeon claims to have created it in 2011 or 2012. "Cut the Kid" was accessed via a puzzle, which the user had to complete before receiving the download. The song features on the deluxe edition of his debut studio album, Adventure (2015).
