= Finale (song) =

Single by Madeon

from the EP The City and the album Adventure (deluxe edition)
- Released: 22 July 2012
- Genre: Electro house; synth-pop; drumstep
- Length: 3:25
- Label: Popcultur; Columbia
- Songwriters: Hugo Pierre Leclercq; Nicholas Petricca
- Producer: Madeon

Madeon singles chronology
| "Icarus" (2012) | "Finale" (2012) | "The City" (2012) |

"Finale" is a song by French DJ and record producer Madeon, featuring vocals from American singer Nicholas Petricca of Walk the Moon. It was released on 22 July 2012 as a digital download in the United Kingdom. The song entered the UK Singles Chart at number 35. The cover art is a coloured silhouette of the skyline of Sydney from the east (which is also used in "Icarus" but with a different background colour).

It was used in an NBCSN commercial during the 2012 Summer Olympics and was frequently used throughout the 2013 X Games. It has also been featured in adverts for National Geographic Channel and PlayStation Vita. It makes appearances in the video games FIFA 13 as part of its soundtrack and PlayStation All-Stars Battle Royale as its opening theme. The song features on the deluxe edition of Madeon's debut studio album, Adventure (2015).

== Track listing ==
Digital download
| No. | Title | Length |
|---|---|---|
| 1. | "Finale" (original mix) | 3:25 |
| 2. | "Finale" (dub mix) | 3:25 |
| 3. | "Finale" (Dillon Francis remix) | 4:43 |

== Charts ==
| Chart (2012) | Peak position |
|---|---|
| Belgium (Ultratip Bubbling Under Flanders) | 12 |
| Belgium Dance (Ultratop Flanders) | 12 |
| Belgium Dance Bubbling Under (Ultratop Flanders) | 11 |
| Belgium (Ultratip Bubbling Under Wallonia) | 17 |
| Belgium Dance (Ultratop Wallonia) | 38 |
| Belgium Dance Bubbling Under (Ultratop Wallonia) | 1 |
| France (SNEP) | 197 |
| Scotland Singles (OCC) | 28 |
| UK Dance (OCC) | 8 |
| UK Singles (OCC) | 35 |

== Release history ==
| Region | Date | Format | Label |
|---|---|---|---|
| United Kingdom | 22 July 2012 | Digital download | Popcultur; Columbia |
