= Imperium (Madeon song) =

Single by Madeon

from the album Adventure
- Released: 17 October 2014
- Genre: Electro house; nu-disco
- Length: 3:18
- Label: Popcultur; Columbia
- Songwriter: Hugo Pierre Leclercq
- Producer: Hugo Pierre Leclercq

Madeon singles chronology
"Cut the Kid" (2014)	"Imperium" (2014)	"You're On" (2014)

"Imperium" is a single produced by French DJ and record producer Madeon. It was released as a free download on 17 October 2014 through Madeon's website, and was later available for purchase. The song serves as the lead single from his debut studio album, Adventure (2015). It entered the UK Singles Chart at number 142.

== Background and release ==
"Imperium" was accessed via a puzzle, which the user had to complete before receiving the free download. The song was added to BBC Radio 1's playlist in October 2014. "Imperium" was featured on the FIFA 15 soundtrack.

In a statement, Leclercq said the song is intended to be the transition between two stages and that the song is intended to capture the feeling of "confidently walking into adversity".

== Chart performance ==
=== Weekly charts ===
Chart (2014)	Peak position
UK Dance (Official Charts)	32
UK Singles (Official Charts Company)	142
