= Home (Madeon song) =

Single by Madeon

from the album Adventure
- Released: 10 March 2015
- Genre: Electro house
- Length: 3:45
- Label: Popcultur; Columbia
- Songwriter: Hugo Pierre Leclercq
- Producer: Hugo Pierre Leclercq

Madeon singles chronology
| "Pay No Mind" (2015) | "Home" (2015) | "Nonsense" (2015) |

"Home" is a single produced by French DJ and record producer Madeon. It premiered in 10 March 2015 on Annie Mac's new BBC Radio 1 show. The song serves as the fourth single from his debut studio album, Adventure (2015). The song features vocals from Madeon himself.

== Background ==
Madeon first teased about "Home" on his Twitter, explaining about the process that lead to the creation of this song, which was made after he finished with his music tour. Madeon said that, "I have this thing I do about once a year. I lock myself in the studio for 24 hours and make two of three new songs from start to finish. By the 18th hour, the combination of sleep deprivation, creative frustration and isolation put me in this weird vulnerable state. I kind of felt like giving up on music to be honest, so I made a song about that."

He further stated that, "Because I was alone in the studio and had a microphone, I ended up recording it myself and finished producing it in the few hours remaining. I don't see myself as a singer but I thought it would be weird to have anyone else do the song so I kept it the same as the demo on the album." "Home" is the first song that features Madeon's very own singing.

== Composition ==
The track is three minutes 45 seconds long and is the final song on the standard version of Madeon's album, Adventure. It features arcing arpeggiators, resonant piano chords, and bombastic kick drums, infused with Madeon's characteristic electro-pop synths. Madeon supplies his own vocals on its confessional verses and snare-supported chorus, which critics said to be distorted, distant and personal and reflects his deepest emotion. The Fader described the song as "a pulsing surge of anthemic electro-pop, radiating M83's benevolent angst to a point where it could blow up ten soccer stadiums at once."

== Chart performance ==
| Chart (2015) | Peak position |
|---|---|
| US Dance/Electronic Songs (Billboard) | 42 |
