= Sam Gellaitry =

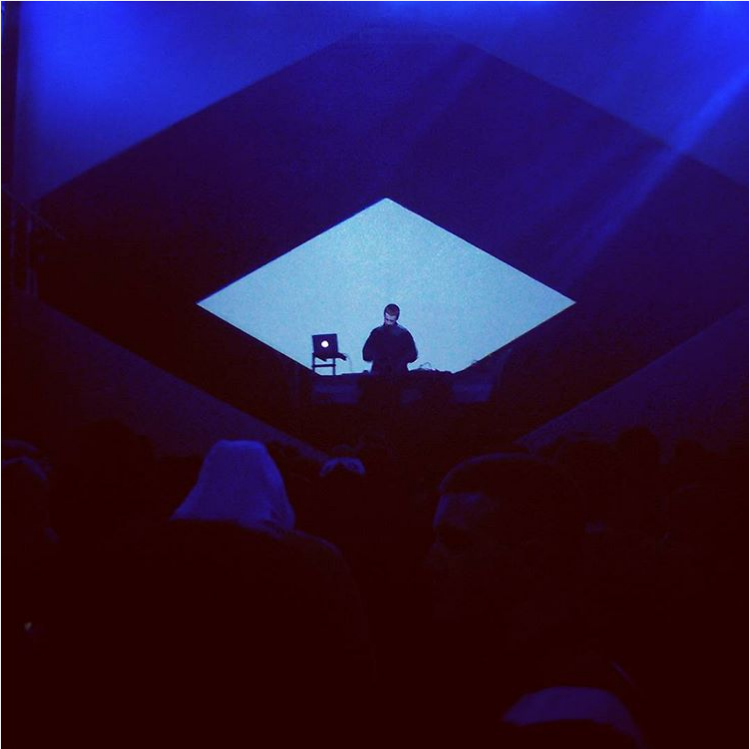
- Gellaitry at the Panoramas festival in Morlaix 2016.

Background information
- Also known as: Sam G; Synth-E-Sam; s. charles
- Born: 6 January 1997 (age 29); Edinburgh, Scotland
- Genres: Electronic; house; electropop; synth-pop
- Occupations: Record producer; multi-instrumentalist; DJ; singer; songwriter
- Years active: 2009-present
- Label: Parlophone

Sam Gellaitry (born 6 January 1997) is a Scottish record producer, DJ, and songwriter. In 2021, he signed to Parlophone. In 2025, he released his debut studio album Anywhere Here Is Perfect.

== Early life ==
Gellaitry was born in Stirling in 1997. He comes from a family of musicians, with his mother previously playing in a band and his father owning a business that makes bagpipes. He was first exposed to electronic music through his brother, who listened to happy hardcore music. He left school at 16 and taught himself to produce, starting an entry level college course in sound production.

== Musical career ==
Gellaitry first became known as a producer on the platform SoundCloud, before earning a record deal with XL Recordings at the age of 18. He later signed with Parlophone. He released a single in 2014 entitled "Powder".

In 2015, Gellaitry released the EP Short Stories, released on Soulection Records. He released three volumes of the Escapism series of EPs: Escapism was released in 2015, Escapism II was released in 2016 and Escapism III was released in 2017.

In 2017, he performed at Coachella, closing at the Gobi tent. In 2018, Gellaitry's song "Long Distance" was featured in a Super Bowl ad for Diet Coke.

In 2019, he released his first album, Viewfinder Vol. I: Phosphene.

In 2021, he released the EP IV, featuring four tracks, including "Duo", which was accompanied by a music video. This was the first project of Gellaitry's that prominently featured his vocals, as his previous works were primarily instrumental or sample based.

In 2022, he released the mixtape album VF Vol. II, a followup to Viewfinder Vol. I, featuring a collaboration with PinkPantheress on "Picture in My Mind" and the single "Serotonin". PinkPantheress described Gellaitry as "a genius level producer". Also in 2022, EDM.com named Gellaitry as one of the 10 best music producers of the year. This Song Is Sick ranked him as number two on their list of "Top 10 Artists to Watch in 2023".

In 2023, producer Kaytranada remixed Gellaitry's single "Assumptions". Gellaitry described Kaytranada as "a true innovator and inspiration to my music".

Gellaitry has also produced for other artists such as Don Toliver and Masego.

Gellaitry's debut studio album, Anywhere Here Is Perfect, released on 7 November 2025.

=== Musical influences ===
Gellaitry has described Flying Lotus, Hudson Mohawke, Rustie, Daft Punk, Röyksopp and Toro y Moi as being some of his musical influences.

== Personal life ==
Gellaitry has synaesthesia, and has discussed in interviews how he sees key signatures in different colours and how this influences his music. He lives in Stirling, where he grew up.

== Discography ==
=== Studio albums ===
- Anywhere Here Is Perfect (2025)

=== Mixtapes ===
- Viewfinder Vol. I: Phosphene (2019)
- VF Vol. II (2022)

=== EPs ===
- Short Stories (2015)
- Escapism (2015)
- Escapism II (2016)
- Escapism III (2017)
- IV (2021)
- Under the Illusion (2023)

=== Singles ===
List of singles, with year released, selected chart positions, and album name shown
Title	Year	Peak chart positions		Album
Title	Year	NZ Hot	US Dance	Album
"Thinking"	2018	—	—	Non-album single
"Duo"	2021	—	—	IV
"Gullible"	2021	—	—	VF Vol. II
"New Wave"	2022	—	—	VF Vol. II
"Angel"	2022	—	—	VF Vol. II
"Picture in My Mind" (with PinkPantheress)	2022	14	—	Non-album single
"Serotonin"	2022	—	—	VF Vol. II
"Intertwine"	2022	—	—	VF Vol. II
"Name to a Face"	2022	—	—	VF Vol. II
"Assumptions"	2022	—	5	IV
"Darling Drive" (with Mette)	2024	—	—	Non-album singles
"Maybe It's U"	2024	—	—	Non-album singles
"More!"	2024	—	—	Non-album singles
"Introspective"	2024	—	—	Non-album singles
"Home"	2024	—	—	Non-album singles
"Start Up a Rumour"	2025	—	—	Anywhere Here Is Perfect
"Curious" (featuring Toro y Moi)	2025	—	—	Anywhere Here Is Perfect
"Love on Me"	2025	—	—	Anywhere Here Is Perfect
"On&On"	2025	—	—	Anywhere Here Is Perfect
"Round & Round"	2026	—	—	Non-album single
"Red Jacket" (with Madeon)	2026			
"—" denotes a recording that did not chart in that territory.
