= Madeon =

French musician and DJ (born 1994)

- Leclercq in 2026

Background information
- Also known as: Madeon; Deamon; Wayne Mont; Nomade; Earpark
- Born: Hugo Pierre Leclercq; 30 May 1994 (age 32); Nantes, France
- Genres: Electropop; house; French house; future bass; glitch hop; electronic; EDM; nu-disco
- Occupations: DJ; record producer; musician; singer; songwriter
- Instruments: Novation Launchpad; synthesizer; vocals; FL Studio; Ableton Live; keyboards
- Years active: 2005–present
- Labels: Popcultur; Columbia; Sony; Universal; Polydor; Casablanca; Republic; Mom + Pop
- Website: madeon.net

Hugo Pierre Leclercq (French pronunciation: [yɡo pjɛʁ ləklɛʁ]; born 30 May 1994), better known by his stage name Madeon (/ˈmædiɒn/), is a French musician, DJ, record producer, singer and songwriter from Nantes, based in Los Angeles. He initially came to widespread public attention at age 17 through a YouTube video, "Pop Culture", where he performed a mash-up of 39 different popular songs in real-time using a Novation Launchpad. It received millions of hits in its first few days of release. Madeon has cited the Beatles and Daft Punk as his greatest musical influences.

Madeon's first EP, The City, was released in 2012. His debut studio album, Adventure, was released in 2015, supported by a 22-stop North American tour. In 2019, Madeon released his second album, Good Faith, as part of the Good Faith Live tour.

Madeon was ranked at number 105 on DJ Mag's top DJs for 2017. In 2017, he was nominated for two Electronic Music Awards with Porter Robinson for Single of the Year and Live Act of the Year. Good Faith was nominated for a 2021 Best Electronic Album Grammy Award.

== Early life ==
Born on 30 May 1994 in Nantes, France, Hugo Pierre Leclercq started composing music at the age of 11.

== Career ==
=== 2010–2014: Career beginnings ===
Madeon began producing hands-up under the name of "Deamon" and Wayne Mont until 2010 when he began producing house music under his current name, Madeon, which is an anagram of his previous nickname. He won a remix competition for "The Island" by Pendulum the same year.

He went on to remix tracks by other electronic artists the following year. A clip of Leclercq performing his mash-up "Pop Culture", uploaded to YouTube on 11 July 2011, propelled him to international fame. It featured samples from thirty-nine songs mixed together on-the-fly using a Novation Launchpad. The clip went viral and reached over six million views in just a few days. According to a Reddit AMA he hosted in November 2019, he had the idea, purchased the Launchpad, and recorded the song all on the same day.

During live performances, apart from the Launchpads, he also uses Allen & Heath's Xone:K2, Novation's Launch Control XL and Ableton Live. His first live performance was in Paris in April 2011 where he was a support act to Yelle, and his UK debut was at The Nest in Dalston, London where he performed alongside the likes of Jacques Lu Cont.

Leclercq was featured several times on "15 Minutes of Fame", a segment of Pete Tong's radio show on BBC Radio 1, with both his debut single "Icarus" and his remix for Deadmau5's "Raise Your Weapon" given their first full play on the show. His live recorded performance debut was for Pete Tong's BBC Radio 1 gala event in Hull on 27 January 2012, where he played a 20-minute-long set.

A debut EP was scheduled to be released at the end of 2011, but then cancelled in favour of multiple singles. The first single, "Icarus", was released on 24 February 2012 on his independent label popcultur.

Madeon toured with Lady Gaga as an opening act during her Born This Way Ball. He later worked with Gaga on three tracks, "Gypsy", "Mary Jane Holland", and "Venus" on her third studio album, Artpop.

In 2012, he was invited to play four major American festivals, the Ultra Music Festival in Miami, Coachella in California, Lollapalooza in Chicago and Electric Daisy Carnival in New York, as well as several UK dance music festivals, including the Dance Arena at the BBC Radio 1's Big Weekend; he also provided support for Swedish House Mafia's headlining set at the Milton Keynes Bowl. Leclercq was listed at number 54 on DJ Mag in 2012. Madeon released a new single on 3 August 2013 titled "Technicolor". On 25 February 2014, Leclercq released a track available for a free download on his website called "Cut the Kid", stating that it was created c. 2011 or 2012.

Many of his songs have been used in media franchises: "Icarus" was featured in the US show Dancing with the Stars in May 2012 and 21 May 2013 (finals with Aly Raisman), on the in-game soundtrack of Forza Horizon, and the animated film The Mitchells vs. the Machines; "Finale" and "Imperium" have been featured in EA Sports' FIFA 13 and FIFA 15 respectively. "You're On" was also featured in Pro Evolution Soccer 2016. "Finale" has also been included in the opening cinematic of PlayStation All-Stars Battle Royale; "The City" appears in EA Sports' NHL 15, Need for Speed: Most Wanted and "Technicolor (Club Extended)" in Need for Speed Rivals. "Finale" and Leclercq's remix of "The Night Out" by Martin Solveig were featured on the official soundtrack of ESPN's Winter X Games XVII event in Tignes, France and both received several plays on air. "Finale" continues to be used as the bumper music for X Games broadcasts.

In January 2014, Leclercq announced a temporary hiatus from touring to focus exclusively on finishing his debut studio album, citing a desire to perfect the project's sonic direction. During this period, he released the unreleased track "Cut the Kid" as a gift to fans.

=== 2015: Adventure ===
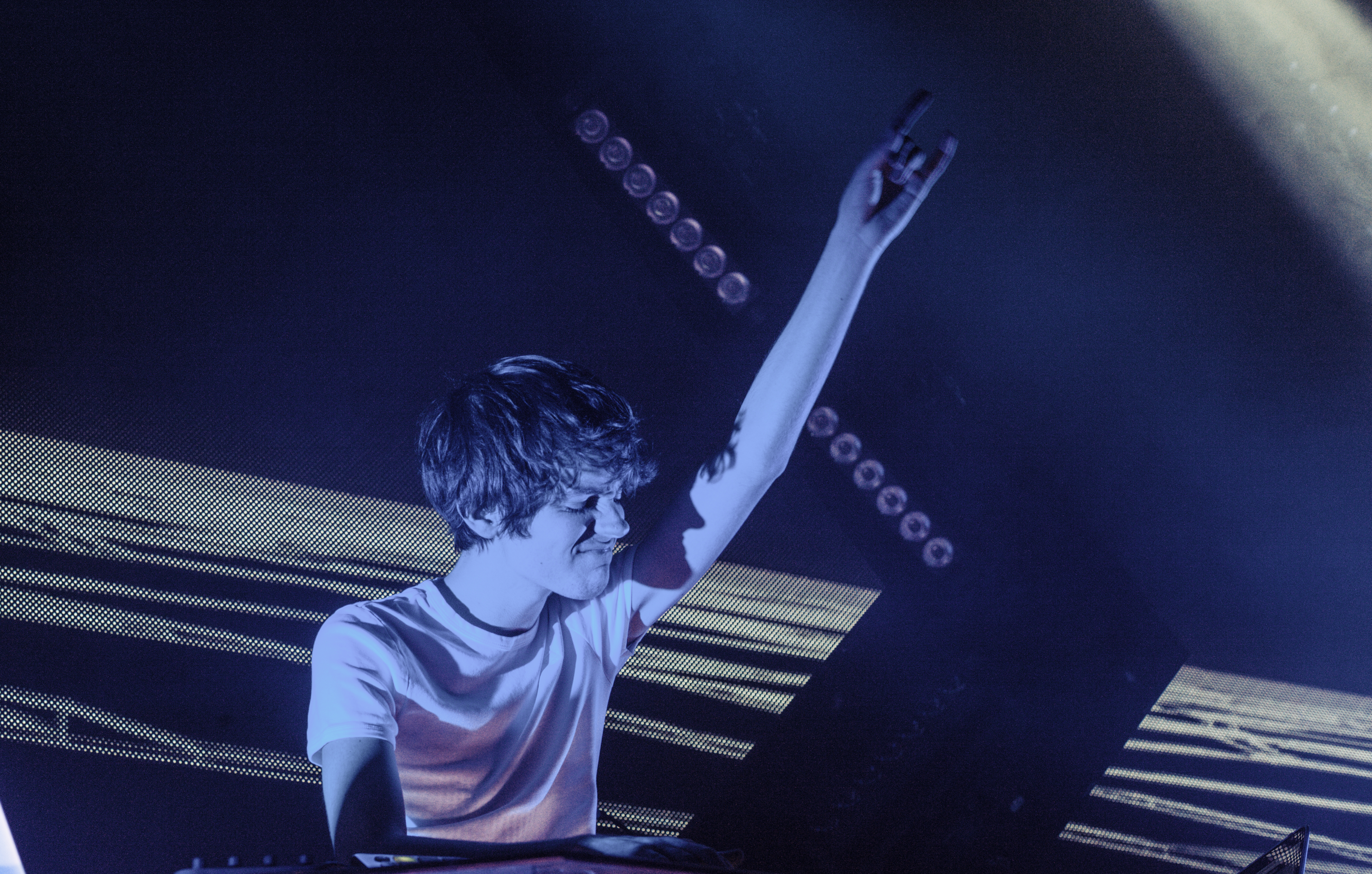
Madeon live in Brussels, 2015

In September 2014, Leclercq released "Imperium" as the lead single from his debut studio album, Adventure. On 8 December 2014, Leclercq released the second single from the album, titled "You're On", featuring Kyan. On 9 February 2015, Leclercq released the album's third single, "Pay No Mind," featuring Passion Pit. The album's fourth single, "Home," was released on 10 March 2015. On 24 March 2015, the final single of Adventure, "Nonsense," was released, featuring Mark Foster of Foster the People. On 27 March 2015, Adventure was released. The album peaked at number 43 on the US Billboard 200 and at number one on the US Dance/Electronic Albums chart.

In mid-2015, Leclercq embarked on his first headlining tour, Adventure Live, consisting of 22 stops in North America. The tour ended on 9 May 2015. Leclercq further promoted his debut studio album on his Pixel Empire US Tour in early 2016, which ended on 21 February 2016.

=== 2016–2017: Shelter ===
On 11 August 2016, Leclercq released with his close friend Porter Robinson a new track called "Shelter". Throughout 2016–2017, he toured the US and Europe alongside Porter Robinson on a live show they called the Shelter Live Tour. This back to back set contained tracks made by both artists, often mixed together between themselves. Throughout the tour both Madeon and Porter also would sing their own songs. Their last performance was on 23 April 2017 at the Coachella Valley Music and Arts Festival.

In August 2016, the new gameplay trailer of EA Sports' FIFA 17 was released, featuring Madeon's remix of "Song 2" by Blur, which was also featured in a BBC Radio 1's Essential Mix in 2012. Leclercq's collaboration with Porter Robinson, "Shelter", was included in the FIFA 17 soundtrack.

=== 2018–2023: Good Faith ===
On 13 November 2017, Leclercq announced that he would be releasing his next project in 2018. Further hints about the project were not officially revealed until 20 August 2018, when Leclercq's creative director was interviewed via a Madeon-inspired podcast called the Pixel Empire Podcast.

On 30 January 2018, Leclercq stated on his Instagram and Twitter that he had moved to the United States to finish his upcoming album. On 20 March 2019, Leclercq announced his new live show would debut on Lollapalooza 2019. He stated this would not be a DJ set but rather a new live show; fans will be expecting new music.

Later that year, on 28 May 2019, Leclercq announced that he would be releasing a new song on 29 May 2019 through a new website, goodfaith.world. On 29 May 2019, the goodfaith.world website was updated with a video previewing the new song, titled "All My Friends", along with locations of record stores in four cities: Los Angeles, New York, Ålesund, and Nantes. Each record store was issued two copies of the new single on clear 7" vinyl. On 30 May 2019, the full official audio was released on YouTube.

On 10 July 2019, Leclercq premiered the first episode of Good Faith Radio (Beats Radio on Apple Music), where he officially played and released his next single, "Dream Dream Dream". Along with the single, he played tracks by other artists, including some sent by his own fans accompanied by fan-made art. He described the radio show as "...a space I want us to share, I want to introduce you to my favorite things and showcase some of the amazing music and art you create." Along with the radio premiere, it was released on music streaming platforms and a visualizer video was released on YouTube.

The Good Faith Live tour was premiered at Lollapalooza 2019, followed by headlining shows in London, Amsterdam, and Paris. A longer North American leg started on 30 October in Vancouver and ended on 14 December in Austin, followed by an Australian tour as part of FOMO Festival in January 2020.

On 29 October 2019, Leclercq revealed that Good Faith would be released on 15 November 2019. In an interview with NPR Music, Leclercq said the album was based on his relationship to joy and his mental health: "I wanted to make music that was celebratory but that hinted at the fact that that joy had to have been reclaimed and fought for a little bit."

Madeon worked again with Lady Gaga on the track "911" from her 2020 studio album, Chromatica.

On 9 May 2020, Madeon played a DJ set for the virtual Secret Sky music festival. During the set, he previewed a song called "The Prince". The song was released on 14 August that year. Along with the release, Madeon launched an alternate reality game. When it was solved, a 6-track EP named 12122017 was found, reportedly named for the date it was made. However, after an email correspondence with Leclercq, he revealed that the EP was produced on 6 December 2017. The creation of the EP is attributed to Madeon's own anger due to "not feeling anything from music", and has referred to the EP as a document that serves as context to the Good Faith album instead of an EP.

On 18 September 2021, Madeon premiered Good Faith Forever, an expanded and updated version of the original tour show, at Second Sky music festival in Oakland, California. Madeon released the track "Love You Back" on 27 April 2022, after a teaser at his Coachella 2022 set. The next year, "Gonna Be Good" released on 22 June as the final single for the era, followed by the final Good Faith Forever shows at Red Rocks Amphitheatre and Shrine Auditorium in November.

=== 2024–present: Gap year and Victory ===
Madeon released a handful of collaborative singles across 2024, including "All Ur Luv" with Wavedash and Toro y Moi, and "Believe It" with Louis The Child, while also providing songwriting and production to "Kiss Me Right", a bonus track from Keshi's Requiem album.

On 24 March 2025, Madeon announced a show at Red Rocks Amphitheatre slated for that October, where he would unveil his next album and live show concept. On 26 September, he released the project's lead single "Hi!" following a listening installation in Los Angeles. On 2 October, he revealed the album title, Victory, and debuted the corresponding Victory Live show at Red Rocks the next day.

In January 2026, Leclercq described the creative direction of Victory as a blend of "punk energy" and dance music, citing the Ramones and Daft Punk as primary inspirations. He characterized the new era as "urgent", focused on "living in the moment", and confirmed a 10th-anniversary vinyl reissue of "Shelter" to celebrate the milestone. Leclercq announced the album would release 26 June 2026 and then played another single from the album "Fire Away" featuring Slayyyter at Coachella. He went on to tour his Victory Live show in the US from 24 September to 21 November 2026.

== Discography ==
Albums

- Adventure (2015)
- Good Faith (2019)
- Victory (2026)

== Tours ==
- Adventure Live (2015)
- Pixel Empire Tour (2016)
- Shelter Live Tour (2016–2017)
- Good Faith Live (2019)
- Good Faith Forever (2021–2023)
- Victory Live (2025–2026)

== Awards and nominations ==
| Year | Award | Category | Work | Result | Ref. |
|---|---|---|---|---|---|
| 2021 | Grammy Award | Grammy Award for Best Dance/Electronic Album | Good Faith | Nominated | |
