= Adventure (Madeon album) =

Studio album by Madeon
- Released: 30 March 2015
- Recorded: 2014–15
- Genres: Electropop; house; nu-disco
- Length: 41:12
- Labels: Popcultur; Columbia
- Producer: Hugo Pierre Leclercq

Madeon chronology
The City (2012)	Adventure (2015)	Good Faith (2019)

Deluxe edition cover

Singles from Adventure
- 1. "Imperium" Released: 17 October 2014; 2. "You're On" Released: 8 December 2014; 3. "Pay No Mind" Released: 9 February 2015; 4. "Home" Released: 10 March 2015; 5. "Nonsense" Released: 24 March 2015

Adventure is the debut studio album by French DJ and record producer Madeon. It was released on 30 March 2015 through Popcultur and Columbia Records. The album features talent and vocals from Kyan, Dan Smith from Bastille, Passion Pit, Mark Foster from Foster the People and Aquilo and was produced entirely by Madeon himself.

The album was promoted by five singles: "Imperium", "You're On", "Pay No Mind", "Home" and "Nonsense", while the deluxe version also includes "Icarus", "Finale", "The City", "Cut the Kid", "Technicolor" and a bonus track in collaboration with Vancouver Sleep Clinic. The album received positive reviews from critics.

== Background ==
In May 2013, Leclercq stated in several interviews that he had begun working on his debut album. At this time, the release was expected to be in early 2014. He revealed his intention to release at least eleven new tracks in 2014, further hinting a possible album release in 2014. In May 2014, he predicted a release date for the second half of 2014.

In early 2014, Leclercq took several months off touring "to focus on writing [his] album". Leclercq began creating "an Adventure sample pack and a collection of a few signature sounds to use throughout album [...] before writing more songs".

In June, Porter Robinson, a good friend of Leclercq, answered a question regarding Adventure in his Reddit Ask Me Anything as: "i've heard madeon's album and it's FUCKING magificent. i've been singing one of them all goddamn day [sic]". Leclercq later confirmed on Twitter that Robinson was referring to the third single "Pay No Mind".

Later in 2014, Leclercq gave out first details about the album. In July, he answered a question on Tumblr on how to describe his album as "start[ing] somewhere and tak[ing] you somewhere else. It goes from euphoric and pop to emotional and widescreen." In an interview, Leclercq revealed that the album will feature "not just club tracks [but] songs and music that touches [him] [it] uses electronic elements, but goes beyond the DJ-role format," also suggesting a new show after the album.

In November, Leclercq promised new music, hinting the release of "You're On", and finished the official artworks for the album a few days later.

Leclercq announced the album's name, Adventure, on 8 December 2014 and premiered of the second single "You're On".

The official album announcement followed on 19 January 2015, which included a release date of 30 March, the official track listing in the standard and deluxe editions, artworks, and pre-order links for all editions.

Madeon's press release states:

With Adventure, I wanted to capture the feeling and sensibility of my teenage years. I wanted the album to start very vibrant and pop and end with a more contemplative tone. In making the record, I both collaborated in the studio with some of my favourite musicians, and wrote and performed vocals on songs myself, two things I hadn’t really done before with my own music.

In February, Leclercq tweeted that he was working on his new live show Adventure Live. The show began on 10 April 2015 in San Francisco, and is a 22-stop tour in North America. The show premiered in London on 31 March.

On 18 March 2015, the Adventure Machine was launched as a promotional tool. The web app allows anyone to mix selected stems from Adventure together using their phone, tablet, computer or Novation Launchpad. Madeon posted on Facebook, stating, "You can combine samples from my album and create new mash-ups/mixes." The app was nominated for a Webby Award.

On 24 March 2015, Adventure premiered on Spotify and iTunes for streaming before the album's physical release. On the same day, Leclercq did a Reddit AMA.

On 29 March 2022, Leclercq formally announced the first pressing of the deluxe version of Adventure releasing the following day. The vinyl included a secret bonus track following the final song of the album Only Way Out called Together, which up until that point had only been played live by Leclercq.

== Packaging ==
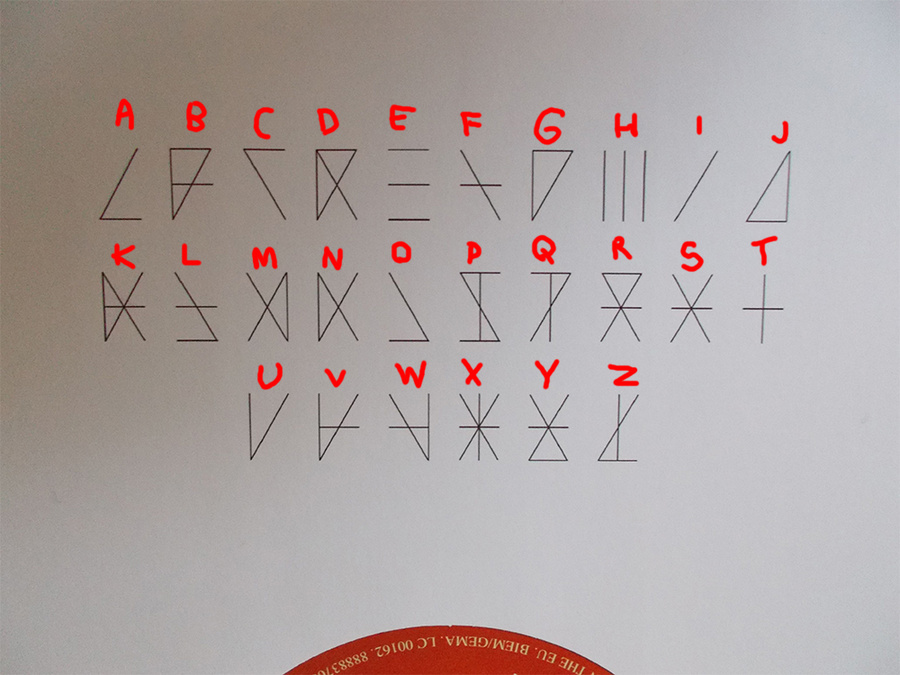
The Madeon alphabet used for most cryptic messages

Like his previous releases, Leclercq designed all artwork himself, with the depiction of "escaping a city to reach the desert" in each single's artwork. The album cover consists of a red desert and blue sky. The single artwork includes the artist name Madeon, and track name written in the 'Madeon alphabet' in the top right corner.

== Promotion ==
=== Music videos ===
A screenshot from Madeon's music video for "You're On". The centered person is Asteria. On the building in the back, a code written in the typical Madeon alphabet is visible (in addition to its translation).

According to a press release, the premise of the music videos is as states:

Set in a remote city, in an undefined future, Asteria is restless to see more of the outside world. She finds a friend in Icarus, who shared her desire of leaving.

"You're On" is the first video in a music video trilogy. The video follows a young woman, Asteria, through a futuristic city. She meets a young man named Icarus and together, they activate an object embedded in a wall. The video ends with a "To Be Continued" message, written in the Madeon alphabet. Leclercq has a brief cameo performing live with Launchpads. The second music video in the trilogy was released for the third single "Pay No Mind" on 20 February 2015. The video follows Icarus and Asteria as they decode secret messages and find an escape from the futuristic city. They successfully find an exit out of the city, and are last seen outside the walls, heading towards the tower in the distance. The music video for "Pay No Mind" was released on Leclercq's newly created Vevo channel. The finale of the trilogy, set to "Nonsense" follows Icarus and Asteria on a long journey through the desert to a tower reminiscent of that on the album artwork of Adventure. As they open the doors to the tower, the Madeon logo forms.

Similar to preceding music videos, the Adventure trilogy includes many cryptic messages written in the typical Madeon alphabet. This code together with hidden messages in preceding releases has not been publicly decoded yet, though several forums are trying to. The ending of "Technicolor" includes a morse code stating "Icarus fell". The website to download Technicolor includes a morse code at the bottom of the page translating to "type it" (originally "- -.-- .--. . .. -"). When directly typing "Icarus fell", the top image of the website will change to "The secret is inside the Pixel Empire". The transition from "Innocence" to "Pixel Empire" shows the Adventure diamond when seen in a spectrogram.

=== Singles ===
In September 2014, a new song by Leclercq called "Imperium" was released unofficially as the part of the soundtrack of the video game FIFA 15. On 18 October 2014, the lead single was officially released as a free download through an interactive puzzle on his website, similar to the release of "Cut the Kid."

On 8 December 2014, Leclercq released the second single titled "You're On" featuring singer Kyan. Leclercq claimed "You're On" was "inspired by my love of pop music, cool chords and chopped up diva vocals." An official music video was released on 15 December 2014, as the first of a music video trilogy. The song was featured in Konami game, Pro Evolution Soccer 2016.

On 18 January 2015, Leclercq announced the third single as "Pay No Mind", featuring Passion Pit, in a BBC Radio 1 interview by Alice Levine. On 3 February 2015, Leclercq tweeted the single artwork and the release date. Like with previous single "You're On", Leclercq posted a low quality preview of "Pay No Mind" on his Instagram. The single was premiered by Zane Lowe on BBC Radio 1 as the Hottest Record on 9 February 2015. The official music video was released on 20 February 2015 as the second part of the music video trilogy.

On 9 March 2015, the fourth single "Home" was premiered by Annie Mac's new BBC Radio 1 show. It is the final track from the standard edition and the first track released in which Leclercq wrote and performed vocals himself. The Fader described "Home" as "a pulsing surge of anthemic electro-pop". Leclercq described the process behind the track:

"I have this thing I do about once a year. I lock myself in the studio for 24 hours and make two or three new songs from start to finish. By the 18th hour, the combination of sleep deprivation, creative frustration and isolation put me in this weird vulnerable state. I kind of felt like giving up on music at the time to be honest, so I made a song about that. Because I was alone in the studio and had a microphone, I ended up recording it myself and finished producing it in the few hours remaining. I dont see myself as a singer but I thought it would be weird to have anyone else do the song so I kept it the same as the demo on the album."

On 24 March 2015, a day after Adventure premiered on Spotify for streaming, "Nonsense", featuring Mark Foster from Foster the People, was released as the fifth single.

== Critical reception ==
Professional ratings
Review scores
Source	Rating
Sputnikmusic	3.5/5 stars
Digital Spy	4/5 stars
Pitchfork	7.8/10
We Got This Covered	5/5 stars

Adventure received positive reviews. Sputnikmusic stated that while many debut albums by other dance music artists received poor recognition, Madeon has made a solid effort. While criticizing a little on the lyrics, Sputnikmusic said that "All of these songs [in the album] have the potential of breaking into the EDM stratosphere and becoming a hit... This is certainly an album that needs to be in your upcoming summer playlist." Digital Spy declared that Madeon managed to put his own style of music into the album. Digital Spy further stated that "...it's his steely determination to not compromise his art that will serve him best in the long run – and it's that boldness that makes his debut album the strongest of starts to his Adventure." Pitchfork meanwhile said that Adventure is "a strikingly versatile collection." and further stated that "Adventure" provides Madeon with many different ways for him to choose from for his future music. EDM Chicago meanwhile remarked that "Adventure is proven to be a catalyst for both pop and dance fans alike... it serves an emotional and meaningful purpose that hands-down has propelled it into being definitively one of the best produced records this year." In a five-star review, We Got This Covered said that the album is "...One which is filled with good vibes, catchy pop sounds, and a lasting state of euphoria." The Fader's author Larry Fitzmaurice commented that the album is an "...expansive, impossibly beautiful landscape that evokes sounds from electronic music's past and present...all coalescing into one of the most radiant pop albums in recent memory."

== Track listing ==
Standard edition
No.	Title	Writer(s)	Length
1.	"Isometric" (intro)	Hugo Pierre Leclercq	1:20
2.	"You're On" (featuring Kyan)	Leclercq; Kyan Kuatois; James Napier	3:12
3.	"OK"	Leclercq; Charlotte Aitchison; Ed Drewett	3:01
4.	"La Lune" (featuring Dan Smith)	Leclercq; Dan Smith	3:39
5.	"Pay No Mind" (featuring Passion Pit)	Leclercq; Michael Angelakos	4:09
6.	"Beings"	Leclercq	3:35
7.	"Imperium"	Leclercq	3:18
8.	"Zephyr"	Leclercq	3:40
9.	"Nonsense" (featuring Mark Foster)	Leclercq; Mark Foster	3:35
10.	"Innocence" (featuring Aquilo)	Leclercq; Ben Fletcher; Tom Higham	3:44
11.	"Pixel Empire"	Leclercq	4:04
12.	"Home"	Leclercq	3:45
Total length:			41:12

Deluxe edition bonus tracks
No.	Title	Writer(s)	Length
13.	"Icarus" (instrumental)	Leclercq	3:34
14.	"Finale" (featuring Nicholas Petricca)	Leclercq; Nicholas Petricca	3:24
15.	"The City"	Leclercq; Cass Lowe; Zak Waters	3:53
16.	"Cut the Kid"	Leclercq	3:17
17.	"Technicolor"	Leclercq	6:25
18.	"Only Way Out" (featuring Vancouver Sleep Clinic)	Leclercq; Tim Bettinson	3:46
Total length:			1:05:32

Deluxe vinyl edition bonus track
No.	Title	Writer(s)	Length
19.	"Together"	Leclercq	2:34
Total length:			1:08:06

Notes

- All songs produced, arranged, mixed and mastered by Hugo Leclercq.
- "You're On" features additional vocals from Yolanda Quartey, backing vocals from Jimmy Napes and additional programming and vocal production by Hal Ritson and Richard Adlam.
- "OK" features additional vocals from Charli XCX and Ed Drewett.
- "Pay No Mind" features guitars from Sam Halliday.
- "Beings", "Zephyr" and "Home" feature vocals from Madeon himself.
- "Imperium" contains an interpolation of "Battle Without Honor or Humanity" by Tomoyasu Hotei.
- "Pixel Empire" contains a sample from "Sync" from the album FEZ OST by Disasterpeace and features guitars from Paul Pinto.
- "The City" features vocals from Zak Waters and Cass Lowe.
- "Technicolor" features guitars from Phil Schwan.

== Charts ==
Chart (2015)	Peak position
Australian Albums (ARIA)	31
Australian Dance Albums (ARIA)	5
Belgian Albums (Ultratop Flanders)	169
Belgian Albums (Ultratop Wallonia)	118
French Albums (SNEP)	29
Japanese Albums (Oricon)	35
UK Albums (Official Charts)	30
UK Dance Albums (Official Charts)	4
US Billboard 200	43
US Top Dance Albums (Billboard)	1

== Release history ==
Region	Date	Format(s)	Edition(s)	Label
Europe	27 March 2015	CD; digital download; vinyl (standard only)	Standard; deluxe	Popcultur; Columbia
Oceania	27 March 2015	CD; digital download; vinyl (standard only)	Standard; deluxe	Popcultur; Columbia
UK	30 March 2015	CD; digital download; vinyl (standard only)	Standard; deluxe	Popcultur; Columbia
US	31 March 2015	CD; digital download; vinyl (standard only)	Standard; deluxe	Popcultur; Columbia
Canada	31 March 2015	CD; digital download; vinyl (standard only)	Standard; deluxe	Popcultur; Columbia
Latin America	31 March 2015	CD; digital download; vinyl (standard only)	Standard; deluxe	Popcultur; Columbia
Japan	31 March 2015	CD; digital download; vinyl (standard only)	Standard; deluxe	Popcultur; Columbia
Various	30 March 2022	Vinyl	Deluxe	Popcultur; Columbia
