= Pop Culture (song) =

Song by Madeon
- Released: 11 July 2011
- Recorded: 11 July 2011
- Genre: EDM; mash-up
- Length: 3:24
- Songwriter: Various
- Producer: Hugo Pierre Leclercq

Music video
- "Pop Culture" on YouTube

"Pop Culture" is a mash-up song created by Hugo Pierre Leclercq, better known by his stage name, Madeon. The song was recorded on-the-fly by Leclercq, when he was seventeen years old, using samples from 39 popular songs, mixed using the software FL Studio controlled with a Novation Launchpad. Leclercq recorded a video of himself creating the mix, which he uploaded to YouTube on 11 July 2011. The video went viral within a few days of release, and it has subsequently been seen more than 60 million times. The video drew attention to Leclercq and would lead to him being signed by Columbia Records and launching his music career.

== Composition ==
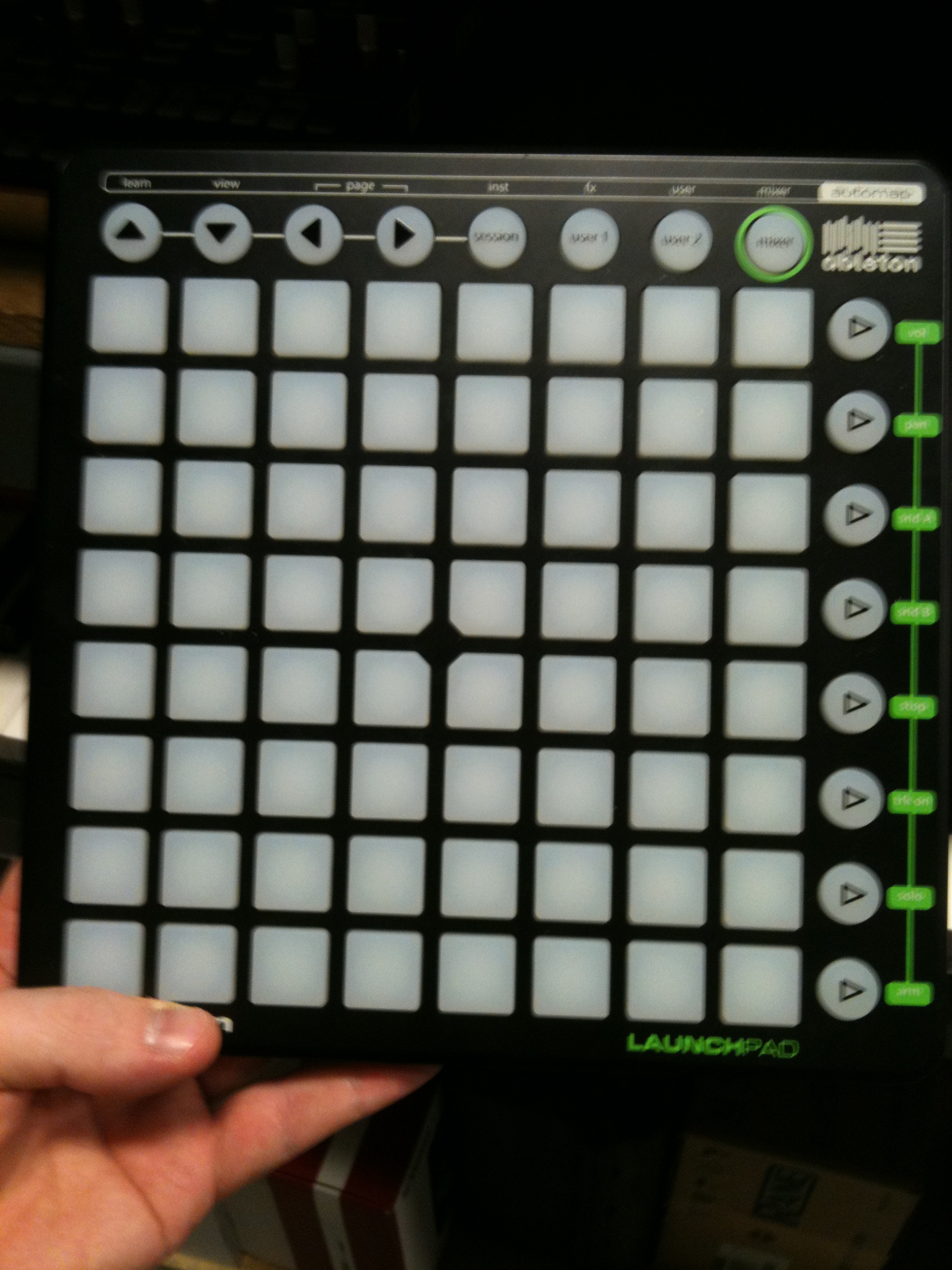
A Novation Launchpad, which Leclercq used to perform "Pop Culture"

At the time of recording the song, Leclercq was 17, living with his parents in Nantes, France. Leclercq was a rising star in the EDM genre, having recently won a remix competition for the song "The Island" by Pendulum in late 2010. He subsequently developed remixes for songs by Alphabeat, deadmau5, and Yelle, with the latter two publicly praising Leclercq's remixes.

Leclercq described the concept for "Pop Culture" as wanting to show the process that electronic mix artists use during live performances. Leclercq stated, "When you go see an electro band, we do not really know what they do on stage." Daft Punk had been a major influence for Leclercq, and had gone to their shows to see how they performed their music live, seeing that they were often just pressing buttons on their panels to make sound.

Subsequently, Leclercq saw an advertisement for the Launchpad, and purchased one. To toy around with it, he pulled samples from his favorite albums and songs at the time. Eventually, he had extracts from 39 different songs, which included:

- Alphabeat – "Boyfriend"
- Alphabeat – "Fascination"
- Bag Raiders – "Shooting Stars"
- The Black Eyed Peas – "I Gotta Feeling"
- Britney Spears – "...Baby One More Time"
- Capsule – "Can I Have a Word"
- Chromeo – "Mamma's Boy"
- Coldplay – "Viva la Vida"
- Daft Punk – "Aerodynamic"
- Daft Punk – "Around the World"
- deadmau5 – "Raise Your Weapon" (Madeon remix)
- deadmau5 – "Right this Second"
- Ellie Goulding – "Starry Eyed"
- Electric Light Orchestra – "Mr. Blue Sky"
- Girls Aloud – "Biology"
- Gorillaz – "Dare"
- Gossip – "Heavy Cross" (Fred Falke remix)
- Gwen Stefani – "What You Waiting For?" (Jacques Lu Cont mix)
- Housse de Racket – "Oh Yeah"
- Justice – "DVNO"
- Justice – "Phantom Part II"
- Katy Perry – "One of the Boys"
- Kesha – "Take It Off"
- Kylie Minogue – "Wow"
- Lady Gaga – "Alejandro"
- Linkin Park – "Crawling"
- Madonna – "Hung Up"
- Martin Solveig (featuring Dragonette) – "Boys & Girls"
- Michael Jackson – "Billie Jean"
- Nero – "Me and You"
- OneRepublic – "All the Right Moves" (Danger remix)
- One-T – "The Magic Key"
- Ratatat – "Shempi"
- Solange – "I Decided" (Freemasons remix)
- Stardust – "Music Sounds Better with You"
- The Buggles – "Video Killed the Radio Star"
- The Killers – "Losing Touch"
- The Who – "Baba O'Riley" (SebastiAn remix)
- Yelle – "Que Veux Tu" (Madeon remix)

He created the video live as he performed the song, uploaded to YouTube, and then left on vacation for about a week. When he returned, he found the video had millions of views, and he had a request to tour Australia. Due to the attention he received from "Pop Culture" and subsequent singles, Leclercq was approached by various record labels to sign up as an artist.

The song was put into dance form by comedian Nathan Barnatt and uploaded to YouTube in August 2011.
