= San Holo discography =

Discography

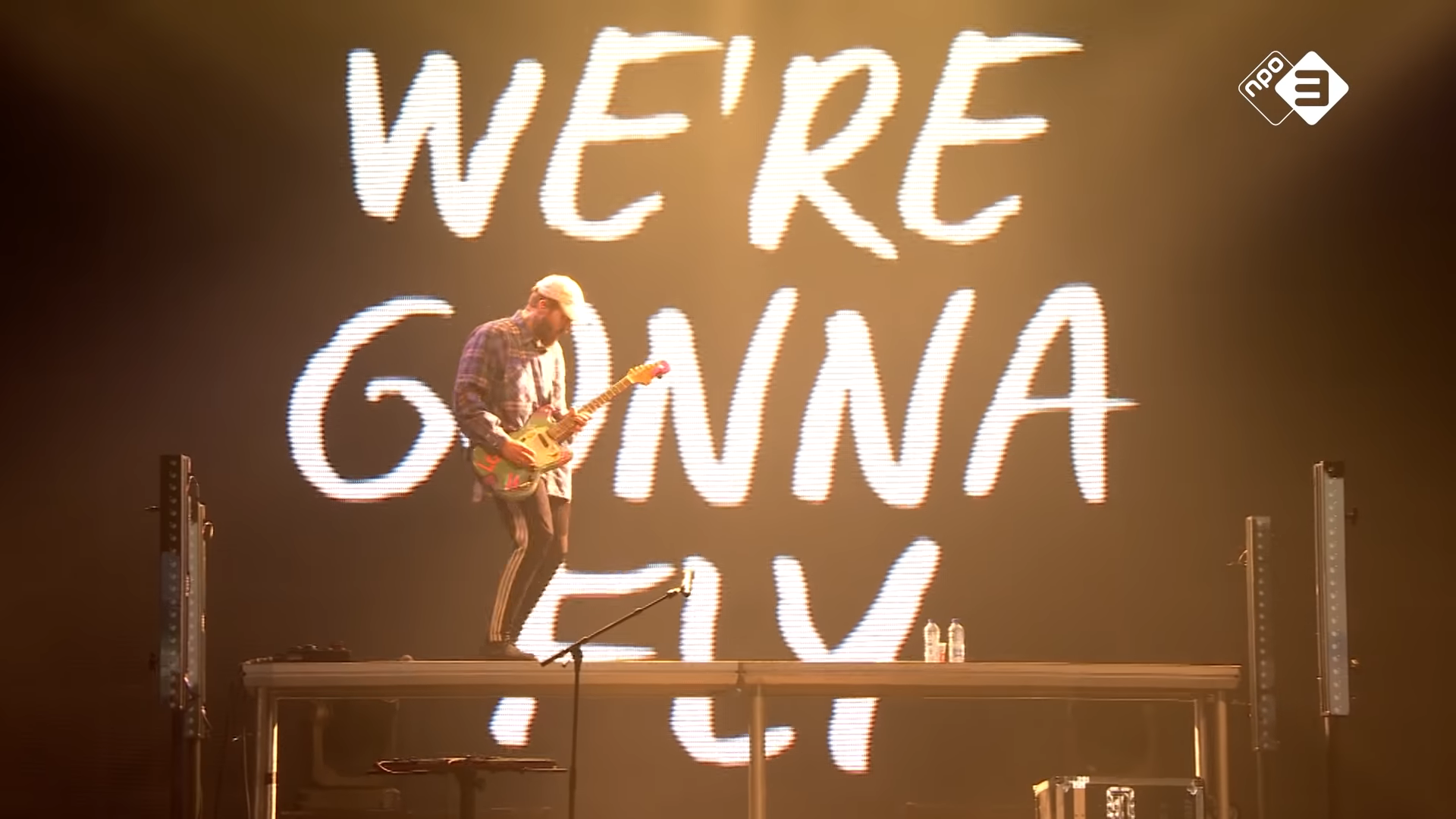
- Studio albums: 3
- EPs: 8
- Singles: 41
- Remixes: 19
- Production credits: 5

The discography of Dutch DJ, musician, record producer and composer San Holo consists of three studio albums, eight extended plays, forty-one singles, five production-credited songs, and nineteen remixes.

In 2016, Holo's single "Light" peaked at 13 on the US Dance charts, and is certified Gold in the United States, Holo's first single to do so. He would return to the charts with "The Future" at 50, "Lift Me from the Ground" at 39, and "Brighter Days" at 49. Holo's debut album, Album1, includes "Show Me", which peaked at 42 on the Dance/Electronic Songs charts in 2018.

In the Netherlands, "I Still See Your Face" peaked at 29 on the Dutch Top 40.

== Studio albums ==
Title	Details	Peak chart positions		
Title	Details	NLD	US Dance	US Heat
Album1	Released: 21 September 2018; Label: Bitbird; Format: Digital download	80	7	20
BB U OK?	Released: 4 June 2021; Label: Bitbird, Counter Records, Liquid State; Format: Digital download	—	3	5
Existential Dance Music	Released: 15 September 2023; Label: Helix Records; Format: Digital download	—	—	—
True Love in a Made Up World	Released: 5 June 2026; Label: Shine Light Records; Format: 2xLP, digital download	—	—	—

== Extended plays ==
Title	Details
Corellia	Released: 26 March 2013; Label: N/A; Format: Digital download
Demons	Released: 10 October 2013; Label: N/A; Format: Digital download, streaming
Cosmos	Released: 18 September 2014; Label: Heroic Recordings; Format: Digital download, streaming
Victory	Released: 25 May 2015; Label: Monstercat; Format: Digital download, streaming
New Sky	Released: 11 March 2016; Label: Monstercat; Format: Digital download, streaming
The Trip	Released: 26 December 2017; Label: Bitbird; Format: Digital download, streaming
Create Create Create (as Casilofi)	Released 28 December 2018; Label: Bitbird; Format: Digital download, streaming
Stay Vibrant	Released 27 March 2020; Label: Bitbird; Format: Digital download, streaming
What is Life?	Released 25 October 2024; Label: Shine Light; Format: Digital download, streaming

== Singles ==
Title	Year	Peak chart positions			Certifications	Album
Title	Year	NL 40	NZ Hot	US Dance	Certifications	Album
"You Don't Know" (with Boehmer)	2014	—	—	—		Non-album singles
"We Rise"	2015	—	—	—	RIAA: Gold	Non-album singles
"Dump It" (with TWRK)	2015	—	—	—		We Are Twrk
"Can't Forget You" (featuring The Nicholas)	2015	—	—	—		Non-album singles
"Bwu"	2015	—	—	—		Non-album singles
"Imissu" (with Father Dude)	2015	—	—	—		Non-album singles
"Alright" (with Yellow Claw)	2016	—	—	—		Non-album singles
"New Sky"	2016	—	—	—		New Sky
"They Just Haven't Seen It" (featuring The Nicholas)	2016	—	—	—		New Sky
"Still Looking"	2016	—	—	—		Gouldian Finch Vol. 1
"Raw"	2016	—	—	—		Non-album singles
"Who Am I" (with Cesqeaux)	2016	—	—	—		Non-album singles
"Old Days" (with Yellow Claw)	2016	—	—	—		The Barong Family Album
"OK!" (with Jauz)	2016	—	—	—		Non-album singles
"Light"	2016	—	—	13	MC: Gold; RIAA: Gold	Non-album singles
"Lines of the Broken" (with Droeloe, featuring CUT_)	2017	—	—	—		Non-album singles
"The Future" (featuring James Vincent McMorrow)	2017	—	—	50		Non-album singles
"I Still See Your Face"	2017	29	—	—		Gouldian Finch Vol. 2
"If Only" (featuring Eastghost, Analogue Dear, Taska Black, Droeloe, Losi, ILIVEHERE., and GOSLO)	2017	—	—	—		Gouldian Finch Vol. 2
"One Thing"	2017	—	—	—		Non-album single
"If You Only Knew" (with What So Not featuring Daniel Johns)	2018	—	—	—		Not All the Beautiful Things
"Right Here, Right Now" (featuring Taska Black)	2018	16	—	—		Non-album singles
"Summertime" (with Yellow Claw)	2018	—	—	39		Non-album singles
"Take Me Home" (with Duskus)	2018	—	—	—		Cute EP
"Worthy"	2018	—	—	—		Album1
"Lift Me from the Ground" (featuring Sofie Winterson)	2018	—	—	39		Album1
"Brighter Days" (featuring Bipolar Sunshine)	2018	—	—	49		Album1
"Forever Free" (featuring Duskus)	2018	—	—	—		Album1
"Surface" (featuring Caspian and Fazerdaze (Note: Artist is uncredited on song listing))	2018	—	—	—		Album1
"Voices in My Head" (featuring The Nicholas)	2018	—	—	—		Album1
"Lead Me Back"	2019	—	—	49		Non-album singles
"Lost Lately"	2019	—	—	—		Non-album singles
"Honest" (featuring Broods)	2020	—	34	25		Non-album singles
"(If Only I Could) Hold You"	2020	—	—	—		Stay Vibrant
"Don't Forget To Breathe Today"	2020	—	—	—		Stay Vibrant
"BB U OK?"	2020	—	—	32		BB U OK?
"Find Your Way" (featuring Bipolar Sunshine)	2021	—	—	—		BB U OK?
"It Hurts!"	2021	—	—	41		BB U OK?
"Black & White"	2021	—	—	—		BB U OK?
"My Fault"	2021	—	—	—		BB U OK?
"You've Changed, I've Changed" (featuring Chet Porter)	2021	—	—	—		BB U OK?
"We Will Meet Again" (with Jai Wolf)	2022	—	—	39		Non-album singles
"Keep You to Myself"	2022	—	—	—		Non-album singles
"All The Highs"	2022	—	—	—		Existential Dance Music
"Don't Look Down" (featuring Lizzy Land)	2023	—	—	—		Existential Dance Music
"Out of Options" (with Midwxst)	2023	—	—	—		Non-album single
"Bring Back the Color" (featuring Aurora)	2023	—	—	—		Existential Dance Music
"Feel Something Real"	2023	—	—	—		Non-album single
"No Place is Too Far" (featuring Whethan and Selah Sol)	2023	—	—	—		Existential Dance Music
"Glow" (with Aura)	2024	—	—	—		Non-album single
"What is Life?" (with Bipolar Sunshine)	2024	—	—	—		What is Life?
"Disappear" (with Artemis Orion and Dobi)	2024	—	—	—		What is Life?
"Feel Again" (with Tchami)	2024	—	—	—		What is Life?
"It's All Happening" (with Daniel Allan and Evalyn)	2024	—	—	—		What is Life?
"We Rise"	2025	—	—	—		Non-album single
"An Introduction to Wholesome Riddim" (with Underbelly)	2025	—	—	—		True Love in a Made Up World
"Broken Hearted" (with Slander featuring Julia Church)	2025	—	—	—		Non-album single
"IYKYK" (with Amanda Joy)	2025	—	—	—		True Love in a Made Up World
"I Feel Alive" (with Klaxx)	2025	—	—	—		Non-album single
"I Wanna Show You" (with RJ Rasin and Alice Aera)	2026	—	—	—		True Love in a Made Up World
"Forever, Forever" (with Julez)	2026	—	—	—		True Love in a Made Up World
"Fade Away" (with Tisoki)	2026	—	—	—		True Love in a Made Up World
"Smiling/Hiding" (with Kompany, Allegra Miles and Underbelly featuring Au5)	2026	—	—	—		True Love in a Made Up World
"—" denotes a recording that did not chart or was not released in that territory.

=== As featured artist ===
Title	Year
"Beautiful" (The Nicholas featuring San Holo)	2014
"Smile On Your Face" (Point Point featuring San Holo)	2015
"Pocket" (The Nicholas, produced with San Holo)	2016
"Happy Now" (Slander, produced with San Holo)	2018
"Shibuya" (Covet featuring San Holo)	2018

== Other charted songs ==
Title	Year	Peak chart positions	Album
Title	Year	US Dance	Album
"Show Me"	2018	42	Album1

== Remixes ==
Title	Year	Original artist(s)	Album
"Double Oreo"	2014	Point Point	Non-album singles
"The Next Episode" (featuring Snoop Dogg)	2014	Dr. Dre	Non-album singles
"Holding U"	2014	Autolaser	Non-album singles
"So High"	2015	Doja Cat	Non-album singles
"Afterlife" (featuring Stacy Barthe)	2015	Tchami	Non-album singles
"CoCo"	2015	O.T Genasis	Non-album singles
"Ms. Jackson"	2015	Outkast	Non-album singles
"In Da Club"	2015	50 Cent	Non-album singles
"Lose Yourself"	2015	Eminem	Non-album singles
"Ride Wit Me"	2015	Nelly	Non-album singles
"I Wish"	2015	Skee-lo	Non-album singles
"Song 2"	2015	Blur	Non-album singles
"Natural Light"	2015	Porter Robinson	Worlds Remixed
"Gettin' Jiggy Wit It"	2015	Will Smith	Non-album singles
"Middle"	2016	DJ Snake	Non-album singles
"In My Room" (featuring Ty Dolla $ign & Tyga)	2016	Yellow Claw & DJ Mustard	Non-album singles
"I'm God"	2016	Clams Casino	Non-album singles
"Ready Yet"	2018	Sasha Sloan	Non-album singles
"Loverboy"	2021	A-Wall	Non-album singles
"Rumble"	2023	Skrillex, Fred Again.. & Flowdan	Non-album singles
