= Album1 =

Studio album by San Holo
- Released: 21 September 2018
- Recorded: 2018
- Length: 58:32
- Label: bitbird
- Producer: San Holo

San Holo chronology
| Album1 (2018) | BB U OK? (2021) |

Singles from Album1
- 1. "Worthy"; 2. "Lift Me from the Ground"; 3. "Brighter Days"; 4. "Forever Free"; 5. "Surface"; 6. "Voices in My Head"

Album1 (stylized as album1) is the debut full-length studio album by Dutch DJ, musician, record producer and composer, San Holo. It was self-released on 21 September 2018, by his independent record label, bitbird. The album features guest appearances from Sofie Winterson, Bipolar Sunshine, James Vincent McMorrow, Yvette Young, Cassini, The Nicholas, Duskus, Caspian and Fazerdaze. The album was supported by six singles: "Worthy", "Lift Me from the Ground", "Brighter Days", "Forever Free", "Surface", and "Voices In My Head".

Following its release, album1 debuted at number seven on the Billboard Dance/Electronic Albums chart for the week of 6 October 2018, becoming Holo's first top ten album. Simultaneously, three singles from album1 entered the Dance/Electronic Songs chart for the tracking week of 6 October 2018; "Lift Me from the Ground" re-entered the charts at No. 39, while "Show Me" and "Brighter Days" debuted at numbers 42 and 49, respectively. album1 was nominated for the Edison Pop Award's Best Dance Album of 2019.

== Background ==
Much of the album was written and recorded from a home studio Holo created from an Airbnb rented in Vestal Avenue in Los Angeles. Unlike most conventional EDM albums, Holo focused on writing and recording with live instruments and using analog tape recorders through the recording process.

The songs on album1 are combined of heavy melodic vocals, guitar riffs, violins, drum beats, and future bass elements. The album draws heavily from San Holo's post-rock inspiration and influences with a contemporary EDM sound in a new sound Holo describes as "post-EDM".

From May 2018 through early July 2018, Holo released snippets of behind-the-scenes footage from unreleased songs including, "Forever Free" and "Worthy". On 26 July 2018, the snippets were revealed to be part of an album release in a video announcement from Sander revealing his debut album album1.

On 3 August 2018, Holo released two singles from the album, "Worthy" and "Lift Me from the Ground" on bitbird while also announcing an upcoming tour for the album. "Lift Me from the Ground" debuted at No. 42 on the Billboard Hot Dance/Electronic Songs chart the week of 18 August 2018.

On 31 August 2018, another single from album1 was released: "Brighter Days", featuring singer Bipolar Sunshine, with an official lyric video for the track. San Holo and Bipolar Sunshine jointly performed the song together at the 3FM Awards on September 5.

Pre-orders for album1 were opened on 7 September 2018, alongside an announcement of an album release date of 21 September via his Twitter. Another single from album1 was released on 14 September 2018, "Forever Free" featuring Duskus.

In the week leading up to the album's release on 21 September, two more singles from the album were released, "Surface" featuring post-rock band Caspian with uncredited vocals by Fazerdaze on the 17th, and "Voices in My Head" featuring The Nicholas on the 19th.

Speaking to Forbes, Holo described the album as "electronic music, but with this new album I’m working on I’m putting a lot of organic, real sounds in there to build a bridge between the EDM world and the more indie world until it becomes one."

== Critical reception ==
Professional ratings
Review scores
| Source | Rating |
|---|---|
| EARMILK | 9/10 |

The album has received generally favorable reviews from critics.

album1 placed number two on Billboard's Critic's Pick Top 10 Best Dance/Electronic Albums of 2018. "album1 is notable for its innovative use of organic instrumentation and analog recording techniques...It's a powerful listen, and there's nothing like seeing San Holo rip a guitar solo while standing in front of his enthralling production, live on stage" said Kat Bein, from Billboard Dance. Brian Bonavoglia from ThisSongSlaps ranked album1 as the top album of 2018 and claims, "[album1] is one of the most forward-things productions we've seen all year." Molly Hudelson from Substream magazine exclaims, "album1 will take you on an emotional journey from start to finish, but rather than forcing a certain emotion at any point, it feels incredibly cathartic. Whether you've been busy with school or work, stressed out by family troubles, or overwhelmed by whatever difficult life circumstances you’re facing at the moment, what we all crave in those moments is a relief...album1 will gently guide you along in letting it all out." EDMSauce editor Sophia Medina confesses, "this was definitely the first album, in a very long time, that I actually enjoyed all the songs on the album. If you couldn't tell already, I’m strongly into songs that can not only touch my heart but can stir my emotions at the same time. This album did just that. My emotions were everywhere! I feel like if an album can create some sort of sentimental connection, then it's one that should definitely be acknowledged." The Nocturnal Times praises album1 to their readers, "there's no surprise the album garnered mass critical acclaim and is a favorite among dance music enthusiasts alike." album1 was ranked number one on the top electronic/dance albums of 2018. Matt Meadow of Your EDM named it their third best album of 2018 adding that "the 12-track album is said to bridge progressive rock with dance music, utilizing a vastly different style of arrangement than most dance music fans are used to. In addition, San brings his soft and powerful guitar riffs into the mix for a deeply personalized production with his signature sound attached to each and every note."

=== Accolades ===
Year-end Lists
| Publication | List | Rank | Reference. |
|---|---|---|---|
| Billboard | Critics Pick - Top 10 Dance/Electronic Albums of 2018 | #2 | |
| ThisSongSlaps | Top 10 Albums of 2018 | #1 | |
| Your EDM | Top 10 Albums of 2018 | #3 | |
| The Nocturnal Times | Top Electronic/Dance Album of 2018 | #1 | |

Awards
| Year | Ceremony | Category | Result | Reference |
|---|---|---|---|---|
| 2018 | Edison Pop 2018 | Best Dance Album of 2018 | Won | |
| 2019 | International Dance Music Awards | Best Electronic Album | Won | |

== Track listing ==
| No. | Title | Writer(s) | Length |
|---|---|---|---|
| 1. | "Everything Matters (When It Comes to You)" | Sander van Dijck; Justin Burns | 5:36 |
| 2. | "Lift Me from the Ground" (featuring Sofie Winterson) | van Dijck; Rutger van Woudenberg | 4:20 |
| 3. | "Show Me" | van Dijck; Sean de Vries | 5:41 |
| 4. | "Brighter Days" (featuring Bipolar Sunshine) | van Dijck; Adio Marchant | 3:56 |
| 5. | "Always on My Mind" (featuring James Vincent McMorrow and Yvette Young) | van Dijck; James Vincent McMorrow; Yvette Young | 3:41 |
| 6. | "Go Back in Time" | van Dijck; van Woudenberg; Samuel Chown | 4:21 |
| 7. | "Love (WIP)" (featuring Cassini) | van Dijck; van Woudenberg; Dorian Gaubert; Young | 4:22 |
| 8. | "Voices in My Head" (featuring The Nicholas) | van Dijck; van Woudenberg; Gaubert; Sjaak Douma | 4:52 |
| 9. | "Worthy" | van Dijck; van Woudenberg | 4:59 |
| 10. | "Forever Free" (featuring Duskus) | van Dijck; Simon White; Tessa Douwstra | 6:22 |
| 11. | "Surface" (featuring Caspian and Fazerdaze) | van Dijck; van Woudenberg; Philip Jamieson; Amelia Murray | 6:02 |
| 12. | "Vestal Avenue" | van Dijck | 4:15 |
| Total length: | | | 58:32 |

Notes

- All track titles are stylized in all lowercase.

== Charts ==
| Chart (2018) | Peak position |
|---|---|
| Dutch Albums (Album Top 100) | 80 |
| US Top Dance Albums (Billboard) | 7 |
| US Heatseekers Albums (Billboard) | 20 |

== Release history ==
| Country | Date | Format | Label | Catalogue |
|---|---|---|---|---|
| Various | 21 September 2018 | Digital download; streaming | bitbird | bba002 |

== Touring ==
Kicking off on 31 October 2018, album1 tour embarked on a 35-date North American tour starting in St. Petersburg, Florida, and wrapping up in Seattle, Washington. It will have support from Taska Black, Duskus, Eastghost, Chet Porter, Baynk, Slow Magic, Said The Sky, The Nicholas, and BeauDamian on select dates.

album1 tour - North America
| Date | City | State/Providence | Venue |
|---|---|---|---|
| 31 October 2018 | St. Petersburg | Florida | Jannus Live |
| 1 November 2018 | Orlando | Florida | The Plaza |
| 2 November 2018 | Jacksonville | Florida | Mavericks |
| 3 November 2018 | Charlotte | North Carolina | The Fillmore |
| 6 November 2018 | Nashville | Tennessee | Cannery Ballroom |
| 7 November 2018 | Tuscaloosa | Alabama | Druid City Music Hall |
| 8 November 2018 | Atlanta | Georgia | Buckhead Theatre |
| 9 November 2018 | Washington | District of Columbia | Echostage |
| 10 November 2018 | Raleigh | North Carolina | The Ritz |
| 11 November 2018 | Charlottesville | Virginia | Jefferson Theatre |
| 14 November 2018 | Toronto | Ontario | Danforth Music Hall |
| 15 November 2018 | Buffalo | New York | Town Ballroom |
| 16 November 2018 | New York | New York | Terminal 5 |
| 17 November 2018 | Pittsburgh | Pennsylvania | Stage AE |
| 20 November 2018 | Portland | Maine | Port City Music Hall |
| 21 November 2018 | Philadelphia | Pennsylvania | Electric Factory |
| 23 November 2018 | Boston | Massachusetts | House of Blues |
| 24 November 2018 | Montreal | Quebec | Corona Theatre |
| 26 November 2018 | Burlington | Vermont | Higher Ground |
| 28 November 2018 | Columbus | Ohio | Bluestone |
| 29 November 2018 | Detroit | Michigan | The Majestic |
| 30 November 2018 | Grand Rapids | Michigan | The Intersection |
| 1 December 2018 | Minneapolis | Minnesota | Skyway Theatre |
| 4 December 2018 | Omaha | Nebraska | Sokol Auditorium |
| 5 December 2018 | Indianapolis | Indiana | Deluxe |
| 6 December 2018 | Kansas City | Missouri | The Truman |
| 7 December 2018 | St. Louis | Missouri | The Pageant |
| 8 December 2018 | Milwaukee | Wisconsin | The Rave |
| 12 December 2018 | Salt Lake City | Utah | The Complex |
| 13 December 2018 | Las Vegas | Nevada | Brooklyn Bowl |
| 14 December 2018 | Los Angeles | California | Shrine Expo Hall |
| 15 December 2018 | San Jose | California | City National Civic |
| 19 December 2018 | Eugene | Oregon | McDonald Theatre |
| 20 December 2018 | Portland | Oregon | Crystal Ballroom |
| 21 December 2018 | Seattle | Washington | |
| 22 December 2018 | Seattle | Washington | |

"I am always thinking into the future and this new music and the tour, I hope will stretch the boundaries within the EDM community to new levels. Singing and playing guitar gives the set a stronger, livelier feel." - Sander van Dijck

On 3 December 2018, San Holo announced his biggest European headline tour to date, weaving through 12 cities across 7 countries with more dates to still be announced. The tour will start in March 2019 and will run the entire duration of the month culminating in a headline show his home country, The Netherlands, at the famed Paradiso in Amsterdam.

album1 tour - Europe
| Date | City | Country | Venue |
|---|---|---|---|
| 18 January 2019 | Groningen | Netherlands | Eurosonic |
| 28 February 2019 | Manchester | United Kingdom | The Deaf Institute |
| 1 March 2019 | Bristol | United Kingdom | Thekla |
| 2 March 2019 | London | United Kingdom | Hangar |
| 6 March 2019 | Oslo | Norway | Parkteatret |
| 7 March 2019 | Copenhagen | Denmark | Pumpehuset |
| 15 March 2019 | Toulouse | France | Rex |
| 16 March 2019 | Paris | France | La Maroquinerie |
| 21 March 2019 | Hamburg | Germany | Mojo |
| 22 March 2019 | Cologne | Germany | Gloria |
| 23 March 2019 | Berlin | Germany | Gretchen |
| 24 March 2019 | Frankfurt | Germany | Zoom |
| 28 March 2019 | Ghent | Belgium | Charlatan |
| 29 March 2019 | Luxembourg | Luxembourg | Den Atelier |
| 30 March 2019 | Amsterdam | Netherlands | Paradiso |

On 22 January 2019, Holo announced on Instagram an extended album1 North American tour across 17 cities, hitting markets Holo missed during the initial North American tour in 2018. The tour will start in Sacramento, CA and will run the entire duration of the month ending in Chicago, IL.

album1 tour - North America
| Date | City | State | Venue |
| 4 April 2019 | Sacramento | California | Ace of Spades |
| 5 April 2019 | San Diego | California | Observatory North Park |
| 7 April 2019 | Flagstaff | Arizona | Orpheum Theater |
| 9 April 2019 | Albuquerque | New Mexico | The Historic El Rey |
| 10 April 2019 | El Paso | Texas | Lowbrow Palace |
| 11 April 2019 | Austin | Texas | Emo's |
| 12 April 2019 | Houston | Texas | Stereo Live |
| 13 April 2019 | New Orleans | Louisiana | Joy Theater |
| 16 April 2019 | Birmingham | Alabama | Iron City |
| 17 April 2019 | Knoxville | Tennessee | The Mill & Mine |
| 19 April 2019 | Tulsa | Oklahoma | Cain's Ballroom |
| 20 April 2019 | Dallas | Texas | Stereo Live |
| 23 April 2019 | Columbia | Missouri | The Blue Note |
| 24 April 2019 | Des Moines | Iowa | Wooly's |
| 25 April 2019 | Iowa City | Iowa | Blue Moose Tap House |
| 26 April 2019 | Cincinnati | Ohio | Bogart's |
| 27 April 2019 | Chicago | Illinois | Aragon Ballroom |
