= Krane (musician) =

American music producer

KRANE
- Birth name: Zachary Krane
- Also known as: KRNE (2014-2016)
- Genres: EDM; future bass; trap
- Occupations: Songwriter; record producer
- Instrument(s): Upright Bass, Guitar, Piano, Digital Audio Workstation
- Labels: Fool's Gold Records, Dim Mak Records, Foreign Family Collective, Young Art, Elysian
- Website: kranemusic.com

Zachary Krane, better known by his stage name KRANE, is an American musical artist, producer and musician from Oakland, CA. Krane is known for his distinct and inventive blend of electronic, hip-hop and dance music.

Krane first began releasing demos, remixes and edits on SoundCloud in 2014, under the moniker KRNE. His work caught the attention of music producer TOKiMONSTA, which, in 2015, resulted in their collaborative single release of “Put It Down” featuring Anderson .Paak. In early 2016 the “Debris” album was introduced; a collection of B-Sides from recording sessions with Kehlani, J. Cole, Bryson Tiller and others. This stabled his first packaged release through Fool's Gold Records.

In 2017, Krane debuted singles "Right Here" and "Akira" with producers Keys N Krates and Ekali, along with his highly anticipated full-length album, FALLOUT, eliciting praise from Huffington Post, Billboard, NYLON, and Pop Crush on his versatile and enticing sound. In the following year, FALLOUT received a full remix album, along with a branded tour and sold out headline shows across the US, culminating in festival performances at Ultra and Coachella. Following the tour, Krane was named Billboard’s “One’s To Watch” in their April editorial.

== Discography ==
=== Albums ===
- Debris — 2016 — Fool's Gold Records
- Sessions — 2017 — Sessions
- Fallout — 2017 — Dim Mak Records
- Sessions, Vol. 2 — 2018 — Sessions
- Getting Better — 2021 — Dim Mak Records
- Sessions, Vol. 3 — 2021 — Sessions

=== Singles ===
==== As lead artist ====
- «Saturn» (with Portrait) — 2014
- «Italics» (with Portrait) — 2015
- «Italics VIP» (with Portrait) — 2015
- «Propane» — 2015
- «Never Stop» — 2015
- «Movin» — 2015
- «I’ll Be Good» — 2016
- «So Nice» (with Alexander Lewis) — 2016
- «Fall Apart» (with Alexander Lewis) — 2016
- «Seventeen» (with Jupe) — 2016
- «Numb» (with SAINTS) — 2016
- «Akira» (with Ekali) — 2017
- «Right Here» (with Keys N Krates) — 2017
- «Spells» (with graves, featuring Blake Skowron) — 2017
- «Monarch» (with Myrne) — 2017
- «Nobody But You» — 2017
- «Next World» (with Quix) — 2017
- «All Again» (with Boombox Cartel) — 2020
- «Body Heat» (featuring Nate Merchant) — 2021
- «Moonbeams» (with Juelz and Haimunu) — 2022

==== As featured artist ====
- «Put It Down» (Tokimonsta featuring Krane and Anderson .Paak) — 2015

=== Remixes ===
- «Hold Fast» (Krne Remix), by San Holo featuring Tessa Douwstra — 2015
- «Drive» (Krne Remix), by Jai Wolf featuring The Chain Gang of 1974 — 2016
- «Odyssey, Pt. 1» (Krane Remix), by Big Gigantic — 2017
- «Onset» (Krane Remix) — 2017
- «Better Not» (Krane Remix), by Louis The Child featuring Wafia — 2018
- «My Life» (Krane Remix), by Zhu and Tame Impala — 2018
