= Marcioz =

Brazilian musician

- Also known as: Gado Archive
- Born: Marcio Zygmunt; 1996; Curitiba, Paraná, Brasil
- Genres: Electronic music
- Years active: 2015–present
- Labels: Bitbird, Mad Decent, Nurtured Ideas, Record Record, Ultra Music, jovemdeu$, Provoke
- Website: itsmarcioz.net

Marcio Zygmunt (born 1996), known professionally as Marcioz, is a Brazilian musician.

== Career ==
Marcioz started producing music when he was 9. When he was 16, he started producing what he classifies as "genreless music". In 2013, he released the song "Kronus" and his first EP, Torture, through Provoke. After being selected to be part of Point Point's competitive music compilation Filet Mignon III with the track "God Ain't Gonna Pay You Back", Marcioz was signed by their record label, Record Record, and released the God Don't Lie EP in May 2015. In April 2016, he released a remix of the song "Baibaba Bimba" by Tenniscoats. In August, he released "Emotional Depth (The Lack Thereof)" on Mad Decent.

In September 2017, he released "Ayre for Rejection" with Slow Shudder. The song was later included on Bitbird's compilation Gouldian Finch 2. In October, he released a remix of "The Future", a song by San Holo with James Vincent McMorrow. In November, he released "The Very Very $hy Pearl". In December, he released "How to Fall in Love with a Machine" with Slow Shudder. Both songs were singles of his How to Make Love $tay EP, released on January 19, 2018, through Bitbird. Claire Biddles of The Line of Best Fit gave a 7/10 rating. In March, he released "Nameless Waltz (She Finally Falls!)". In November, he reased "Interstellar!" with Slow Shudder.

In January 2019, Marcioz released "Watch Out! Black God I$ in Town". In April, "The Generated Freakshow", a song by Marcioz and BeauDamian, appeared on Bitbird's Gouldian Finch 3. In July, he released "Halenkind". The same month, he released a remix of Hotel Garuda's "Head in the Trees". In August, he released the Mulato Tragidy EP. In 2020, he released the De/Colonial Writing$ EP. In 2022, he released his debut studio album, Between Giant $houlders.

== Discography ==
Includes old releases and releases that are currently under "Gado Archive".

=== Albums ===
- Between Giant $houlders (2022)

=== Extended plays ===
- Torture (2013)
- God Don't Lie (2015)
- How to Make Love $tay (2018)
- Mulato Tragidy (2019)
- De/Colonial Writing$ (2020)

=== Singles ===
- "God Ain't Gonna Pay You Back" (2015)
- "Ayre for Rejection" (part. Slow Shudder) (2017)
- "The Very, Very $hy Pearl (The Pulse)" (2017)
- "How to Fall In Love With a Machine" (feat. Slow Shudder) (2017)
- "Nameless Waltz (She Finally Falls!)" (2018)
- "Interstellar!" (part. Slow Shudder) (2018)
- "Watch Out! Black God I$ in Town" (2019)
- "The Generated Freakshow" (Marcioz x BeauDamian) (2019)
- "Halenkind" (2019)
- "Mulato Proibido" (2019)
- "White Colonial Product & Mistura das Águas" (2020)
