= Effloresce (Covet album) =

Studio album by Covet
- Released: July 13, 2018
- Studio: VuDu Studios
- Genre: Math rock
- Length: 30:59
- Label: Triple Crown Records
- Producer: Mike Watts, Frank Mitaritonna

Covet chronology
Effloresce (2018)	Technicolor (2020)

Effloresce is the debut studio album by the American math rock band Covet, released on July 13, 2018, through Triple Crown Records. Recorded at VuDu Studios in Port Jefferson, New York, the album marked the band’s first full-length studio release. The album features instrumental compositions with guest appearances from San Holo and Mario Camarena.

== Background and recording ==
Following the release of their 2015 Currents EP, Covet began work on their first full-length album while continuing to tour. Guitarist Yvette Young described the writing process for Effloresce as more structured than the band’s earlier releases, with an increased focus on melody and arrangement.

The album was recorded at VuDu Studios in Port Jefferson, New York, with producers Mike Watts and Frank Mitaritonna. The album artwork was painted by Young, who has frequently incorporated visual art into the band’s releases.

The record was named in-part as a tribute to the debut of the album of the same name by British post-rock band, Oceansize.

== Composition ==
Effloresce consists of six instrumental tracks characterized by melodic guitar lines, complex rhythmic structures, and clean-toned production. The album blends elements of math rock with post-rock and progressive influences, favoring fluid lead guitar passages often enhanced with modulated delay and reverb.

“Glimmer” was originally composed as a solo acoustic piece and later evolved into a heavier arrangement when adapted for the full band.

Two tracks feature guest musicians, including electronic artist San Holo on “Shibuya” and Mario Camarena of Chon on “Sea Dragon,” adding textural contrast while maintaining the album’s instrumental focus.

== Release and promotion ==
The album was preceded by the release of the singles “Shibuya” on May 23, 2018, and “Glimmer” on June 28, 2018. Effloresce was released on July 13, 2018, via the band’s Bandcamp page and was made available as a digital download, CD, and vinyl through Triple Crown Records.

== Critical reception ==
Effloresce received generally positive reviews from music publications. New Noise Magazine praised the album’s melodic clarity and technical execution, while Everything Is Noise highlighted Young’s expressive guitar work and the record’s dynamic pacing.

== Track listing ==
All tracks written and performed by Yvette Young, David Adamiak, and Forrest Rice, except where noted.

No.	Title	Length
1.	"Shibuya" (featuring San Holo)	5:45
2.	"Glimmer"	3:48
3.	"Sea Dragon" (featuring Mario Camarena)	5:33
4.	"Gleam"	2:57
5.	"Falkor"	7:37
6.	"Howl"	5:19

== Personnel ==
- Yvette Young – guitar, additional layering
- David Adamiak – bass
- Forrest Rice – drums
