= Droeloe =

Dutch electronic music duo

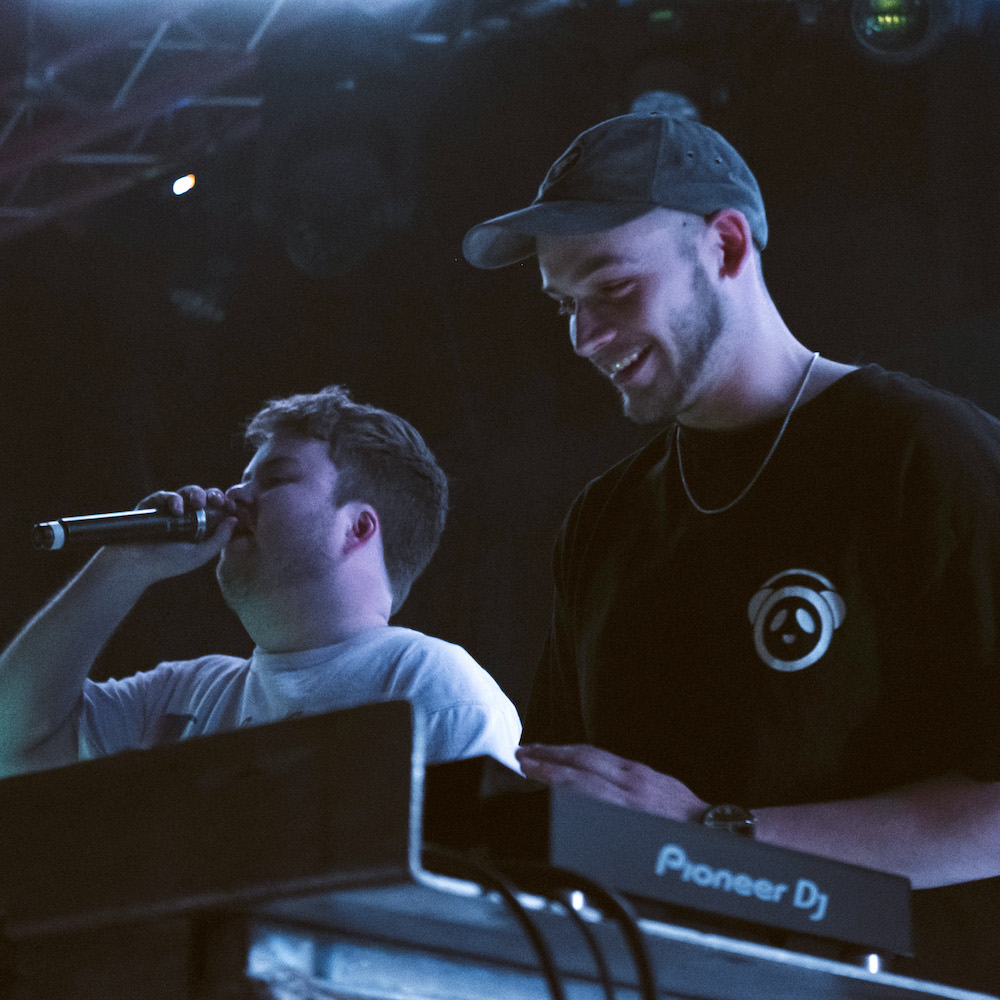
- Hein Hamers (left) and Vincent Rooijers (right) in 2020

Background information
- Origin: Utrecht, Netherlands
- Genres: Future bass; EDM
- Years active: 2016–present
- Labels: Monstercat; Heroic; Bitbird
- Members: Vincent Rooijers
- Past members: Hein Hamers

Droeloe ([ˈdrulu], stylised as DROELOE) is an electronic music project formed by Dutch musician Vincent Rooijers in 2016. Hein Hamers was also part of the project until his departure in 2020.

== Career ==
Vincent Rooijers and Hein Hamers met at the Utrecht School of Arts around 2014. Rooijers was studying music and composition, while Hamers was studying visual arts. They worked on art projects at school and made music in their spare time. The project began as a joke; Hein said that "we were just joking around. That kind of got really serious really quickly so..." Rooijers explained that the name "Droeloe" is also a joke, and that "It kind of means being drunk or uplifted in a way, but it also means actually shit so the best way to translate it would be to be shitfaced I guess". Their inspirations include Hybris, Culprate, Clark, Camo and Krooked, Noisia, Still Woozy, Anderson .Paak, Sufjan Stevens, Bibio and Avishai Cohen.

In May 2017, they collaborated with San Holo for the song "Lines of the Broken". The next month, they released "Jump" featuring Nevve, which was then used in August in an advertisement for the Apple Watch. In 2019, they started their tour The Choices We Face, in support of their EP of same name.

On October 21, 2020, Hamers announced his departure from the project. A month later, an anthology album, A Matter of Perspective, was released.

On May 19, 2023, a new single, "Feeble Games", was released, followed by the announcement of an American tour. On June 17 Droeloe announced album The Art of Change, with "Feeble Games" being its first single. It was followed by the release of a new single, "Landscape", featuring Banji. It was followed by a live video on June 30. On July 4, a third single was released, "Decision", followed by the fourth single, "Downside Up", featuring Transviolet on August 11. A fifth single, "Foolish Fish", was released on September 8. The album was released on the 15th.
