= Boombox Cartel =

Mexican/American record producer

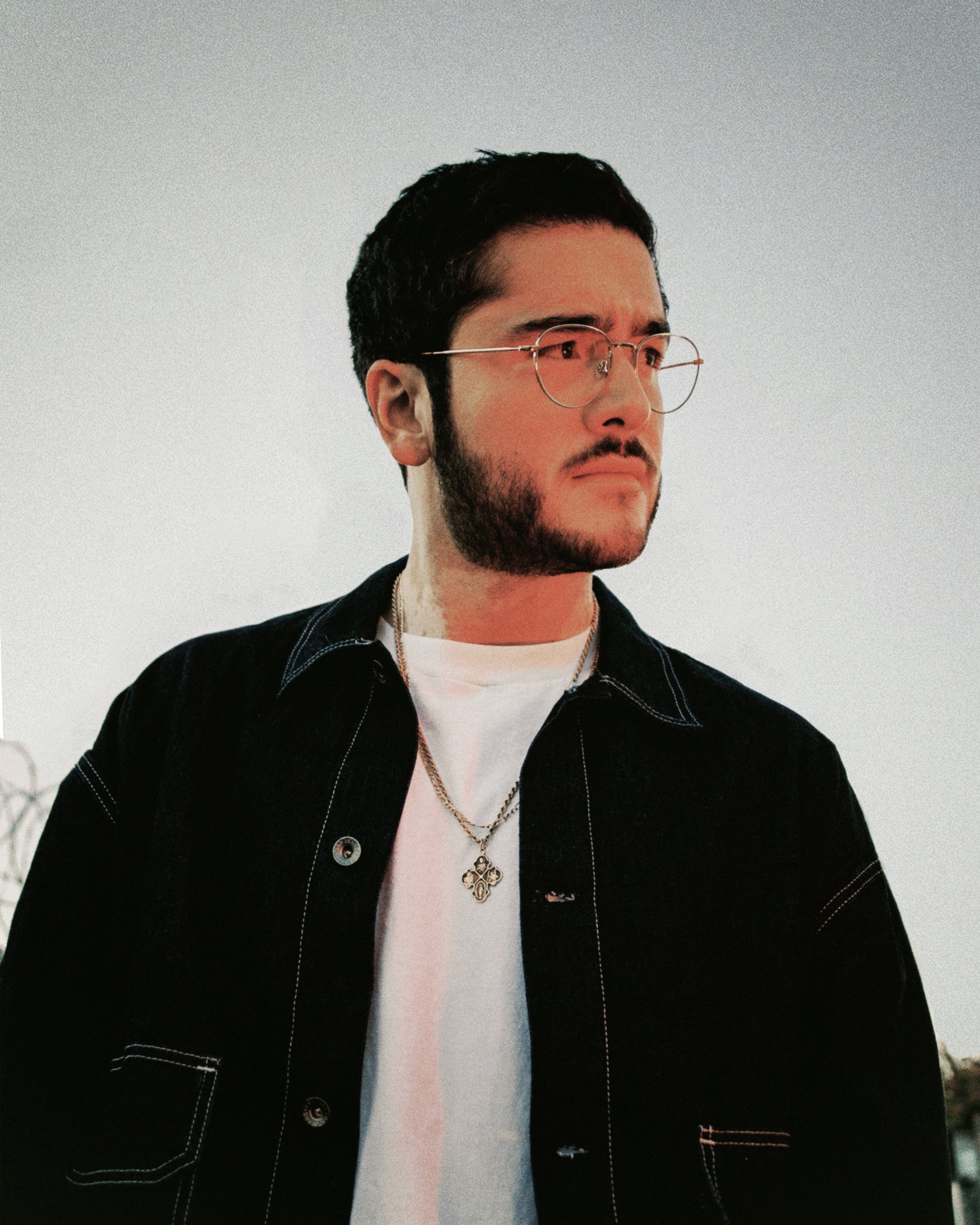
- Americo Garcia of Boombox Cartel

Background information
- Born: Americo Alejandro Garcia; July 20, 1991 (age 34); Laredo, Texas, U.S.
- Origin: Monterrey, Mexico
- Genres: Dubstep; trap; bass
- Occupations: DJ; producer
- Years active: 2012—present
- Labels: Mad Decent; Owsla; Spinnin' Records
- Website: boomboxcartel.com

Boombox Cartel is a Los Angeles–based DJ act consisting of producer Americo Garcia (of Laredo, Texas) and writing partner, Jorge Medina (of Monterrey, Mexico).

== History ==
Americo Garcia and writing partner Jorge Medina met while in high school in Monterrey, Mexico. After graduating the two moved to St. Paul, Minnesota, to study audio engineering and music production at the now-defunct McNally Smith College of Music. After a brief stint in Minnesota they relocated to Los Angeles, California to further pursue their musical careers.

Having just arrived in LA, inspired by the city's vast diversity and multicultural influences Americo and Jorge self-released their breakout track, “B2U” featuring Ian Everson in 2015. The track immediately garnered the attention of notable artists like Skrillex, Diplo, and Martin Garrix.

Boombox Cartel eventually signed with Diplo's label Mad Decent in 2016 and continued to develop their on-point production and sonic progression which was put on full display within the debut EP Cartel in April 2017.

== Releases ==
| Release | Year | Label |
|---|---|---|
| Virus | 2015 | Self-Release |
| Spaceless | 2015 | Self-Release |
| Scream | 2015 | Self-Release |
| Where's My Money | 2015 | Self-Release |
| Hardcut | 2015 | Self-Release |
| B2U (featuring Ian Everson) | 2015 | Self-Release |
| Aftershock (featuring Nghtmre) | 2015 | Mad Decent |
| Colors (featuring Grabbitz) | 2016 | Spinnin' Records |
| Flip (featuring Bro Safari) | 2016 | Self-Release |
| Dancing With Fire (featuring Stalking Gia) | 2016 | Self-Release |
| Supernatural (featuring Quix) | 2016 | Mad Decent |
| Cartel EP | 2017 | Mad Decent |
| Alamo | 2017 | Mad Decent |
| Whisper (featuring Nevve) | 2018 | Mad Decent |
| Moon Love (featuring Nessly) | 2018 | Mad Decent |
| ID (featuring Flosstradamus) | 2018 | Mad Decent |
| NBD | 2018 | Self-Release |
| People I Know (featuring Panama) | 2018 | Self-Release |
| Nothing To Hide (featuring Karra) | 2019 | Self-Release |
| 4U (featuring Breakfast N Vegas, Tory Lanez, Bad Bunny) | 2019 | Self-Release |
| New WIP (featuring MadeinTYO) | 2019 | Mad Decent |
| Drip (featuring Dillon Francis and Desiigner) | 2019 | Mad Decent |
| All I Want (featuring Griff Clawson) | 2019 | Self-Release |
| Remember | 2019 | Self-Release |
| Máquina | 2020 | Self-Release |
| All Again (with Krane) | 2020 | Dim Mak Records |
| Shadow (with Moody Good featuring Calivania) | 2021 | Monta |
| Cartel II EP | 2021 | Monta |
