= Catharsis (Covet album) =

Studio album by Covet
- Released: April 7, 2023
- Studio: Sharkbite Studios
- Genre: Math rock
- Length: 28:30
- Label: Triple Crown Records
- Producer: Scott Evans

Covet chronology
Technicolor (2020)	Catharsis (2023)

Catharsis is the third studio album by the American math rock band Covet. It was released on April 7, 2023 through Triple Crown Records. The album features primarily instrumental compositions, with select tracks incorporating vocals, and includes contributions from additional musicians.

== Background and recording ==
Following the release of their 2020 album, Technicolor, Covet toured extensively and began writing and recording Catharsis. In 2022, Covet separated from longtime bassist David Adamiak, and drummer Forrest Rice departed. During a recording session on November 5, 2022, the band's 2007 Ford E350 tour van was stolen from an Oakland studio parking lot.

The album was recorded over multiple sessions at Sharkbite Studios in Oakland, California, and produced by Scott Evans of Antisleep Audio.

== Composition ==
As with Covet's first two albums, Catharsis features primarily instrumental tracks, led by melodic guitar refrains and odd-time signatures. Guitarist and vocalist Yvette Young conceptualized each song as an escape into the world of a different fantasy character. Young continues frequent use of various guitar effects pedals, including a range of fuzzes and delays. Most songs on the album utilize the non-standard open guitar tuning FACGCE, a characteristic tuning of related genres and some of Covet's earlier work.

== Release and promotion ==
The lead single "Firebird" was released on February 23, 2023, and promoted via several online music outlets.

Catharsis was released on April 7, 2023, by Triple Crown Records in digital and physical formats. Covet toured the United States and Canada promoting the release of the album, with new bassist Jon Button and Jessica Burdeaux on drums. Scarypoolparty and altopalo opened during the five-week tour.

== Critical reception ==
Critics received Catharsis generally favorably, praising the mix of clean and gritty guitar melodies and welcoming the experimental instrumentation not found in Covet's earlier releases.

Pitchfork rated the album 7.5 out of 10, praising the balance between complex guitar work and the pacing of the rhythm section.

== Track listing ==
All tracks written by Yvette Young.

No.	Title	Length
1.	"Coronal"	3:46
2.	"Firebird"	4:40
3.	"Bronco"	3:12
4.	"Vanquish"	3:30
5.	"Interlude"	2:16
6.	"Smolder"	3:18
7.	"Merlin"	3:36
8.	"Lovespell"	4:12

== Personnel ==
- Yvette Young – guitar, vocals, keys, piano, synthesizer, artwork
- Jon Button – bass
- Jessica Burdeaux – drums, track 1
- Forrest Rice – drums, tracks 2–3 and 5–8
- Alex Rose – saxophone, track 8
