= Ark Patrol =

Solo musical project by Brandon Gomez

- Born: 1995 (age 30–31); Honolulu, Hawaii
- Origin: Los Angeles, California, U.S.
- Genres: Electronic, chillwave, indie electronic, future bass
- Years active: 2014–present
- Labels: Heroic Music Group, bitbird
- Members: Brandon Gomez

Ark Patrol is an American solo musical project of an American musician Brandon Gomez. He started the project in 2014 and gained widespread international attention with his 2015 viral single "Let Go" featuring Veronika Redd.

== History ==
Brandon Gomez was born in 1995, in Honolulu, Hawaii. He launched the Ark Patrol project in 2014 while studying music synthesis at the Berklee College of Music in Boston, Massachusetts. After signing with the music label Heroic Music Group, he debuted with the EP Saccade and his full-length album Voyager in 2014. In 2015, Gomez released his self-titled EP, which included the single "Let Go" featuring vocalist Veronika Redd. While the track gained traction in indie electronic circles upon release, it became a global hit in 2020 after becoming a viral sensation on TikTok, which got 272.2 million streams on Spotify as of August 2026.

In 2018, Gomez was diagnosed with testicular cancer, forcing him to stop his music production. After the recovery, He released LP Primo in 2018. Gomez made an appearance on other musician tours like Big Wild and Evan Giia. His music became mainstream, including features in the trailer for HBO's series Euphoria and commercial campaigns for Microsoft. Gomez released projects such as Geode in 2020 and signed with Nettwerk Records to release his studio album Gem in 2024.

== Discography ==
=== Studio albums ===
Title	Album details
Voyager	Released: 2014; Label: Heroic Recordings; Format: Digital download, streaming
Primo	Released: 2018; Label: Heroic Recordings; Format: Digital download, streaming
Ark Patrol	Released: 2019; Label: Self-released; Format: LP, digital download, streaming
Gem	Released: 2024; Label: Nettwerk; Format: LP, digital download, streaming

=== Extended plays ===
Title	EP details
Ambition	Released: 2014; Label: Heroic Recordings
Saccade	Released: 2014; Label: Heroic Recordings
Ark Patrol	Released: 2015; Label: Heroic Recordings
Hex	Released: 2016; Label: Heroic Recordings
Ghost Forest	Released: 2016; Label: Heroic Recordings
Geode	Released: 2020; Label: Heroic Recordings

=== Singles ===
Title	Year	Album / EP
"Sun"	2014	Non-album single
"Let Go" (featuring Veronika Redd)	2015	Ark Patrol
"Soirée"	2016	Non-album single
"Curious" (featuring Victoria Zaro)	2016	Non-album single
"To Know You" (featuring Jenni Potts)	2018	Non-album single
"Fiend"	2019	Ark Patrol
"Hold On" (featuring Veronika Redd)	2024	Gem
