= Victory (EP) =

EP by San Holo
- Released: 25 May 2015
- Recorded: 2014–2015
- Genre: Future bass; trap
- Length: 11:56
- Label: Monstercat
- Producer: Sander van Dijck

San Holo chronology
Cosmos (2014)	Victory (2015)	New Sky (2016)

Victory is the fourth extended play by Dutch electronic music record producer San Holo. Canadian independent electronic label Monstercat released the extended play on 25 May 2015. The extended play gathered generally positive reviews and was later accompanied by a remix extended play, released on 17 November 2015.

== Background and release ==
On 28 April 2015, Monstercat uploaded a teaser video to their YouTube channel simply titled "Victory", with the description saying "IV-V". Some fans conspired to figure out the teaser on their own, deciphering "IV-V" as the date 4 May, of which is also known as Star Wars Day. Fans further connected the date to the character Han Solo, switching the first letters of the first and last names to arrive at the stage name of Dutch future bass producer Sander van Dijck, San Holo.

On 4 May 2015, Monstercat released the song "Victory" to promote the extended play of the same name, announcing the extended plays release date as 25 May 2015. After release, the song became one of the most played Monstercat songs on SoundCloud, reaching over fifty-thousand plays on the first day.

In an interview with Dancing Astronaut, Van Dijck spoke about the development and visual components created to for the extended play, stating:

"With our creative company Bitbird we worked on a visual concept for this EP, to create visuals that fit perfectly with the music and its intention. It all ties together, the artwork, teasers and the video clips. To us, the concept is crystal clear in our minds, but not verbalized. It’s our expression of how we envisioned this project. For the viewers and listeners, it is open to interpretation."

— Dijick talking about the development of the extended play.

On 25 May 2015, the extended play was released exclusively as a digital download on international digital stores through Monstercat. "Hold Fast" and "Victory" were both featured on the compilation album Monstercat 022 – Contact. Monstercat later released a remix of "Hold Fast" by American electronic producer Krne on 3 November 2015, distributed for free via Toneden. In an interview with Tabitha Neudorf of UKF Music, Van Dijck stated that he chose to release the extended play on Monstercat because of their fanbase, saying that "All of those people always get so excited about a new release; I’ve never seen that on another label. The fans also have such high expectations and really trust the label to give them quality. It gave me great exposure, and the fans are brutally honest. They’ll always say whether they hate it or they love it."

== Critical reception ==
Victory was well received by most critics. Austin Evenson of Dancing Astronaut praised the extended play, writing calling it Van Dijck's "most insightful form of musical expression yet". Writing for Nest HQ, Nathan Beer described all three of the songs featured on the extended play as the best fits for set-closing tracks, writing that the songs' "high energy, sturdy composition, and new synths and sounds unique to his brand showcase exactly what we expected and more." Your EDM's Peter Rubinstein called the extended play "diverse", saying that the "bold tracks each embody a life and emotion of their own, and combine to form a truly beautiful and spiritual journey." Sam Waggoner of Run The Trap described the songs as melodic, 8-bit and bass heavy, stating that "each track showcases his creativity and fearlessness to experiment with different sounds, which typically result is something super fresh and innovative." Writing for By The Wavs, Nick Grindrod praised the extended play, calling it a "victory for San Holo" and described it as unique in that it "has a mood where you can dance to the music if you want, or sit back and just enjoy it." EDMTunes' Keith Buhler commended the extended play, stating that it is "expertly crafted with lush detuned chords, unique vocal chops, spacious reverberated arps and hip-hop infused beats to create an overall nostalgic yet adventurous tone."

== Track listing ==
Digital download – EP
No.	Title	Length
1.	"Victory"	4:01
2.	"Hold Fast" (featuring Tessa Douwstra)	3:30
3.	"Shrooms"	4:25
Total length:		11:56

Digital download – Remixes
No.	Title	Length
1.	"Hold Fast" (featuring Tessa Douwstra, Krane Remix)	3:32
2.	"Victory" (Daktyl Remix)	2:53
Total length:		6:27

== Release history ==
Region	Date	Format	Version	Label	Ref.
Worldwide	25 May 2015	Victory – EP	Digital download	Monstercat	
Worldwide	17 November 2015	Victory (The Remixes)	Digital download	Monstercat	
