= Worthy / Lift Me from the Ground =

Single by San Holo

from the album Album1
- Released: August 2, 2018
- Genre: Electronic music
- Length: 9:20
- Label: Bitbird
- Composers: Sander van Dijck, Rutger van Woudenberg
- Producer: Sander van Dijck

San Holo singles chronology
"Take Me Home" (2018)	"Worthy / Lift Me from the Ground" (2018)	"Brighter Days" (2018)

"Worthy / Lift Me from the Ground" (stylized in lowercase) is a dual-single by the Dutch musician San Holo, released on August 2, 2018 as the first and second single from his debut album, Album1.

== Background and release ==
"Worthy" was one of the first songs that Holo wrote with Album1 in mind. The lyrics of the song were inspired by a conversation he had with his ex-girlfriend. The artist said that, after a long process, he had finally found a way to incorporate his guitar playing style into his electronic music. "Lift Me from the Ground" started out as a "little melody", also on guitar. He stated that, at the time he wrote the melody, he knew it would be "the heart of the song". Holo wrote its lyrics with The Nicholas. Initially, Holo would sing the vocals, but he said he "didn't like it". He then decided to use Sofie Winterson's vocals. Both songs were released as a double single on August 2, 2018. He explained that he decided to release both songs together because "they are true companions". "Lift Me from the Ground" featured in the Netflix film To All the Boys: P.S. I Still Love You (2020).

== Tracklist ==
1. Worthy — 4:59
2. Lift Me from the Ground (featuring Sofie Winterson) — 4:20

== Charts ==
Chart (2018)	Peak position
US Dance/Electronic Songs (Billboard)	— (Note: Separately, "Lift Me from the Ground" reached number 39.)
