= Technicolor (Covet album) =

Studio album by Covet
- Released: June 5, 2020
- Studio: VuDu Studios
- Genre: Math rock
- Length: 48:33
- Label: Triple Crown Records
- Producers: Mike Watts, Frank Mitaritonna

Covet chronology
Effloresce (2018)	Technicolor (2020)	Catharsis (2023)

Technicolor is the second studio album by the American math rock band Covet, released on June 5, 2020, through Triple Crown Records. The album followed the band’s 2018 debut Effloresce and continued their focus on instrumental compositions.

== Background and recording ==
Following extensive touring in support of Effloresce, Covet began developing material for Technicolor with an emphasis on refining their compositional approach. The band has described the album as a progression toward more deliberate arrangements and emotional pacing, considering the work to be their most diverse body of work to date.

Phillip Jamieson of Caspian is featured as an additional guitarist on the track "Predawn".

The album name is a reference to the technique of colorizing old film, with the band's arrangements meant to capture a similar nostalgic spirit. As with Effloresce, guitarist Yvette Young painted the artwork used for the album. The album was recorded at VuDu Studios in Port Jefferson, New York, produced by the same team that worked on the previous release.

== Composition ==
Technicolor features primarily instrumental tracks that combine clean and overdriven guitar tones with complex rhythmic structures and melodic development. Two tracks include vocals and lyrics, written and performed by Young, the first such songs from Covet.

Young’s guitar work continues to serve as the primary melodic voice, supported by rhythmic interplay between bassist David Adamiak and drummer Forrest Rice. Young employs several non-standard open guitar tunings, two-handed tapping techniques, and modulated guitar effects. Several tracks explore softer textures and slower tempos compared to the band’s earlier material.

== Release and promotion ==
Prior to the album’s release, Covet shared several tracks digitally, accompanied by music videos and promotional features through online music publications. Technicolor was released on June 5, 2020, and made available in digital and physical formats through Triple Crown Records.

== Critical reception ==
Technicolor received positive reviews from music publications, with critics highlighting its compositional maturity and textural depth. Reviewers note an increased range of techniques and wider sonic range compared to the Covet's previous release.

== Track listing ==
All tracks written and performed by Yvette Young, David Adamiak, and Forrest Rice, except where noted.

No.	Title	Length
1.	"Good Morning"	3:07
2.	"Atreyu"	5:25
3.	"Parachute"	6:13
4.	"Predawn" (featuring Phillip Jamieson)	3:27
5.	"Nero"	6:37
6.	"Pirouette"	1:36
7.	"Ares"	6:00
8.	"Parrot"	4:41
9.	"Odessa"	6:46
10.	"Farewell"	4:41

== Personnel ==
- Yvette Young – guitar, vocals, album artwork
- David Adamiak – bass
- Forrest Rice – drums
- Phillip Jamieson – additional guitar on "Predawn"
