= Covet =

American math rock band

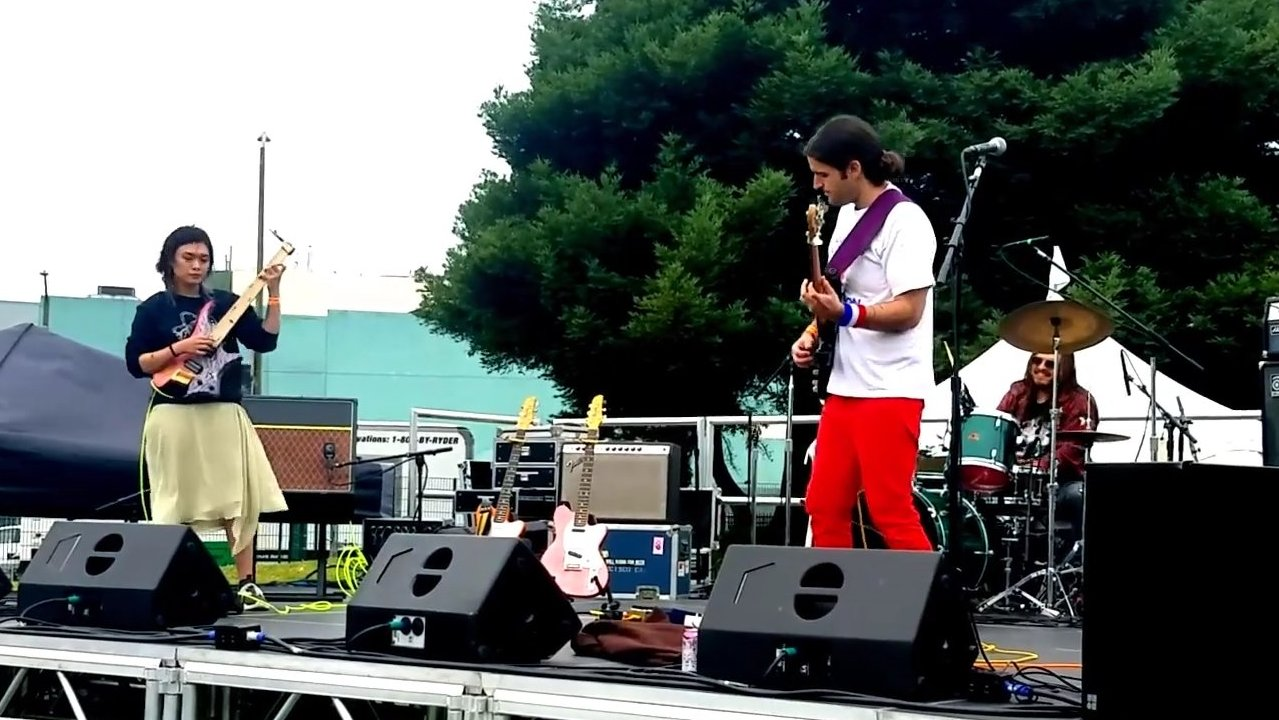
- Covet performing live in 2019 in San Francisco, California

Background information
- Origin: California, United States
- Genres: Math rock, instrumental rock
- Years active: 2010s–present
- Label: Triple Crown Records

Covet is an American instrumental math rock band formed in California, led by guitarist and composer Yvette Young. The band is known for its blend of math rock, post-rock, and progressive influences, as well as Young’s melodic guitar style and frequent use of non-standard tunings. Covet has released three studio albums between 2018 and 2023.

== History ==
=== Formation and early activity ===
Covet began as a solo project by Yvette Young, who initially released instrumental compositions online before expanding the project into a collaborative band format. Young has described the early material as an outlet for exploring melody and texture outside of traditional band structures, drawing influence from math rock and post-rock scenes.

By the mid-2010s, Covet had developed into a touring band and released the EP Currents in 2015. As the project gained wider attention through live performances and online coverage, Covet signed with Triple Crown Records, marking a shift toward full-length studio releases and broader distribution.

=== Effloresce (2018) ===
Covet released their debut studio album, Effloresce, on July 13, 2018. Recorded at VuDu Studios in Port Jefferson, New York, the album introduced the band’s instrumental approach to a wider audience and featured guest appearances from electronic artist San Holo and guitarist Mario Camarena of Chon. Reviews noted the record’s emphasis on melodic clarity alongside technical guitar work, establishing Covet’s identity within the math rock genre.

=== Technicolor (2020) ===
The band’s second album, Technicolor, was released on June 5, 2020. Compared to the band’s debut, the album featured longer compositions and greater dynamic contrast, as well as the introduction of vocals on select tracks. Guitarist Philip Jamieson of Caspian contributed additional guitar on the track “Predawn.” Critics described the album as a stylistic expansion that retained the group’s instrumental foundation while exploring a broader emotional range.

=== Catharsis (2023) ===
Covet released their third studio album, Catharsis, on April 7, 2023. Recorded at Sharkbite Studios in Oakland, California, and produced by Scott Evans of Antisleep Audio, the album was created during a period of transition for the band, including lineup changes prior to its release.

Musically, Catharsis maintained Covet’s instrumental focus while incorporating additional textures and vocals on select tracks. Pitchfork rated the album 7.5 out of 10, highlighting its balance of intricate guitar arrangements and rhythmic pacing. The band supported the release with a North American tour featuring a revised lineup.

== Musical style ==
Covet’s music is primarily instrumental and characterized by intricate guitar melodies, complex rhythmic structures, and clean, effects-driven production. The band’s sound is most commonly associated with math rock, while also incorporating elements of post-rock and progressive rock. Young’s guitar work frequently employs open tunings, two-handed tapping techniques, and layered delay and reverb effects, contributing to the band’s textural approach.

Across its releases, Covet has emphasized melody alongside technical execution, with later albums incorporating broader dynamic shifts and expanded instrumentation.

== Members ==
- Yvette Young – guitar, vocals
- Claire Puckett – bass
- Jessica "J Burd's Beats" Burdeaux – drums

=== Former Members ===
Initial lineup:

- Yvette Young – guitar, vocals
- David Adamiak – bass
- Ben Wallace-Ailsworth – drums

2015 Currents – 2017 lineup:

- Yvette Young – guitar, vocals
- David Adamiak – bass
- Keith Grimshaw – drums

2018 Effloresce lineup:

- Yvette Young – guitar, vocals
- David Adamiak – bass
- Forrest Rice – drums

2022 lineup:

- Yvette Young – guitar, vocals
- Brandon Dove – bass
- Jessica "J Burd's Beats" Burdeaux – drums

2023 Catharsis lineup:

- Yvette Young – guitar, vocals
- Jon Button – bass
- Jessica "J Burd's Beats" Burdeaux – drums

Timeline:

== Discography ==
=== Studio albums ===
- Effloresce (2018)
- Technicolor (2020)
- Catharsis (2023)
