= Stay Vibrant =

EP by San Holo
- Released: 14 May 2020
- Recorded: 2020
- Length: 33:38
- Label: bitbird
- Producer: Sander van Dijck

Singles from Stay Vibrant
- 1. "(If Only I Could) Hold You"; 2. "Don't Forget to Breathe Today"; 3. "In the End I Just Want You to Be Happy"; 4. "Idk Anything (Demo)"; 5. "In Case I Never See You Again..."; 6. "We're All Just on our Way Home"; 7. "Staring at the Sea Without You Next to Me"

Stay Vibrant (stylized in lowercase) is an EP by Dutch musician San Holo. The EP was released on his independent record label, Bitbird, in Spring of 2020 with weekly releases. The EP consists of seven singles: “(if only i could) hold you”, “don’t forget to breathe today”, “in the end i just want you to be happy”, “idk anything (demo)”, “in case i never see you again…”, “we’re all just on our way home”, and “staring at the sea without you next to me”. The EP features artists such as Analogue Dear, I Live Here (stylized as ILIVEHERE), and Luwten.

In an interview with DJ Times, San Holo said that he would be releasing new songs every Monday "for the next couple of weeks, months even maybe. I call it the 'Stay Vibrant Collection'” It's just something I want to give to my fans in these weird times. It's also a very good way for me to experiment and try new things."

== Background ==
The Stay Vibrant EP was inspired by San Holo looking for a way to express his emotions in quarantine during the Coronavirus disease 2019 pandemic. The first single, “(if only i could) hold you” released 27 March 2020, incorporates lush guitar chords, melodies, and vocals. The second single on the EP, “don’t forget to breathe today" was accompanied by a playful music video featuring augmented reality animals. The following single, released 13 April 2020, “in the end i just want you to be happy” was an instrumental track that included guitar riffs that were also showcased in a performance video. His acoustic song “idk anything (demo)” shows his audience how he is continuing to venture into other genres outside of electronic music. The song was inspired by making the best out of life and acknowledging that we’re all just human. “in case i never see you again…” featuring Analogue Dear brought out delicate and emotional melodies from them both, and was released with an official music video. “we're all just on our way home” featured vocals from Luwten. On 11 May 2020, San Holo closed off the music collection with “staring at the sea without you next to me” (feat. ILIVEHERE.), blending together familiar electronic and guitar-driven sounds.

After the release of the ‘Stay Vibrant’ EP, San Holo streamed weekly on Twitch (service) to stay engaged with his fans. He broadcast footage from past live performances such as shows at Electric Daisy Carnival in 2017, Red Rocks Amphitheatre in June 2019, and Lollapalooza in 2019. Bitbird, San Holo's independent record label, also hosted their first ever livestream called “a day with bitbird”. The livestream featured a set from San Holo and was presented on Diplo's Revolution on SiriusXM.

San Holo also participated in Porter Robinson's Secret Sky Online Music Festival in May 2020, where he had the opportunity to premiere new music from the ‘Stay Vibrant’ collection. Funds raised from this festival were donated to the MusiCares COVID-19 Relief Fund.

== Track listing ==
No.	Title	Length
1.	"(if only i could) hold you"	4:20
2.	"don't forget to breathe today"	4:07
3.	"in the end i just want you to be happy"	5:32
4.	"idk anything (demo)"	3:12
5.	"in case i never see you again..." (featuring Analogue Dear)	6:28
6.	"we're all just on our way home" (featuring Luwten)	4:40
7.	"staring at the sea without you next to me" (ILIVEHERE.)	5:18
Total length:		33:38

Notes

- All track titles are stylized in lowercase.

== Release history ==
Country	Date	Format	Label	Catalogue
Various	14 May 2020	Digital download; streaming	bitbird	bb094-7
