= I Still See Your Face =

Single by San Holo
- Released: September 12, 2017
- Recorded: 2016
- Genre: House music; pop
- Length: 3:38
- Label: Bitbird
- Songwriter: San Holo

San Holo singles chronology
"The Future" (2017)	"I Still See Your Face" (2017)	"If Only" (2017)

Music video
- "I Still See Your Face" on YouTube

"I Still See Your Face" is a single by Dutch music producer San Holo which was released on Bitbird, his own label, on September 12, 2017. Holo wrote and recorded the song in 2016. "I Still See Your Face" was included on the album Gouldian Finch 2, released on October 5, 2017, and its remixes were released on October 31 of that year. Holo has performed live and acoustic versions of the song, which received generally-positive reviews and reached number 29 on the Dutch Single Tip chart.

== Production and release ==
Holo wrote and recorded demo vocals for the song on a MacBook in a U.S. Airbnb during a 2016 tour, and intended to call a vocalist to finish the song later. However, "For some reason these first crappy recordings sounded so right on this song, [and] I decided to keep my own vocals on it this time." This was the first time that he included his vocals on a song. According to Holo, "I Still See Your Face" "was supposed to be a pop song"; however, he also said that he knew that it "was gonna be a house song".

On September 9 and 10, 2017 (just before its release), he made two posts – one each day – with excerpts from the song. The song was released digitally on September 12 on Bitbird (Holo's own label), accompanied by a music video; an a cappella version was released three days later. The release of the compilation album, Gouldian Finch 2 (with "I Still See Your Face" the first track), was also announced, and the album was released on October 5. On October 29, Holo performed an acoustic version of the song on a 3FM Talent Session. A remix album, I Still See Your Face (The Remixes), was released two days later on Bitbird. The album contains remixes by Flaws, GOSLO, Hundaes, Lotus and Ellis. The song reached number 29 on the Dutch Single Tip chart for the week of November 11. On January 8, 2018, Holo performed it on the Dutch talk show De Wereld Draait Door.

== Reception ==
I recorded some chords ... I put [them] in a synth, play them ... and sometimes when I lay down the chords [I] already hear a melody ... and sometimes it's really nice to have something recorded on what you just made up, so I just grabbed the microphone off the laptop ant put it on and I started humming ... and sometimes when you hum, phonetically, some words come out ... and sometimes I think that the things you sing when you don't think about it, they're actually really meaningful to you that moment ...

— Holo, explaining the production of "I Still See Your Face"

"I Still See Your Face" was generally well-received. Run the Trap's Max Chung called the song "catchy" and, according to a Billboard writer, "It's a beautiful song". HighClouds' Christian Gomez agreed, calling it "one of [San Holo's] prettiest, most upbeat singles to date." Earmilk's Katey Ceccarelli wrote, "(...) to actually hear him delivering tender, wistful lyrics is a powerful moment for the Dutch producer's fans." For DJ Times, Brian Bonavoglia wrote that the song features "a lethal dose of [Holo's] vibrant signature-style production". Pia Talwar of the Noiseporn website wrote that "I Still See Your Face" has "a danceable groove, vibrant keys and San Holo's familiar, quirky signature sound" and called the song "laid-back". A Project U reviewer called it "a magical, sad pop song". According to Langston Thomas of the This Song Is Sick website, "San perfectly blends vibrant soundscapes and unique lo-fi production elements". According to Your EDM's Karlie Powell, "if the incredibly sweet-sounding production were actual sugar, it would be pure and raw."

== Tracklist ==
- Single: "I Still See Your Face" – 3:38
- Remix album:
  - "I Still See Your Face" (Flaws remix) – 3:04
  - "I Still See Your Face" (GOSLO remix) – 4:19
  - "I Still See Your Face" (Hundaes remix) – 3:05
  - "I Still See Your Face" (Lotus remix) – 3:23
  - "I Still See Your Face" (Ellis remix) – 2:37
