= The Art of Change =

Studio album by Droeloe
- Released: September 15, 2023
- Length: 47:38
- Producer: Vincent Rooijers

Droeloe chronology
A Promise Is Made (2019)	The Art of Change (2023)

The Art of Change is a studio album by Dutch musical project Droeloe, released on September 15, 2023.

== Background and composition ==
Droeloe was a duo formed by Vincent Rooijers and Hein Hamers. On October 21, 2020, Hamers announced his departure from the project. Rooijers said that, since then, he felt like he became a different artist, "not so much in a musical or creative way, but more so in a holistic sense of who I am as a person and what it means to push a project like this forward". He said this process was a big inspiration for The Art of Change.

The album contains voice memos from young, old, and AI-generated voice actors. Rooijers said that these messages were inspired by the idea that "[e]ngaging in a continuous conversation with myself makes it easier to gain control over the direction I grow in as an individual." Each track was accompanied by 360-degree videos, which were done in collaboration with the artist Funi. Rooijers referred to the videos as "homes" for the songs and explained: "The songs are inspired by ideas I want to emphasize within myself and by attaching the songs to the homes I can revisit them more easily."

== Promotion and release ==
On May 19, 2023, the first single, "Feeble Games", was released, followed by the announcement of an American tour. On June 17, the album was officially announced along with the release of the second single, "Landscape", featuring Banji. It was followed by a live video on June 30. On July 4, a third single was released, "Decision", followed by the fourth single, "Downside Up", featuring Transviolet on August 11. A fifth single, "Foolish Fish", was released on September 8. Before the album's release, Droeloe announced a first listen experience on Bandcamp days prior. The album was released on the 15th.

== Reception ==
Konstantinos Karakolis of EDM.com praised The Art of Change's sound and visuals, saying that it "makes for a reflective adventure through time and space", and that it is "as impressive musically as it is visually, driven by frenetic percussion, vibrant sound design and unpredictable drums all throughout".

== Track listing ==
All tracks are written by Vincent Rooijers, except where noted.

1. "Spark" – 1:12
2. "Foolish Fish" (Rooijers, Morris Brandt) – 2:41
3. "Strange Wave" – 3:54
4. "Landscape" (Rooijers, Twan de Roo, Jasper Meurs, Gilles van Wees, Rutger van Woudenberg) – 2:41
5. "Mundane Av." – 3:38
6. "Kicking Gates" – 2:04
7. "A Current, A Void" – 3:42
8. "Feeble Games" – 3:02
9. "Lion Heart" (Rooijers, Lisa van Nes) – 2:44
10. "Hermit" (Rooijers, Emilia Ali) – 3:58
11. "The Wheel" – 1:12
12. "Decision" – 4:23
13. "Downside Up" (Rooijers, Sarah McTaggart) – 3:36
14. "Terminal Velocity" – 3:42
15. "Counting Ten" – 5:09
