= BB U OK? =

Studio album by San Holo
- Released: June 4, 2021
- Recorded: September 2019–January 2020
- Studio: Echo Park, Los Angeles
- Length: 72:56
- Label: Bitbird; Counter Records
- Producer: Mr Hudson; Chet Porter; Hundaes; Johan Lenox; Mountain Range; Mr. Carmack; The Nicholas; San Holo

San Holo chronology
Album1 (2018)	BB U OK? (2021)	Existential Dance Music (2023)

Singles from BB U OK?
- 1. "BB U OK?" Released: 1 December 2020; 2. "Find Your Way" Released: 3 February 2021; 3. "It Hurts!" Released: 10 March 2021; 4. "Black and White / My Fault" Released: 14 April 2021; 5. "You've Changed, I've Changed" Released: 22 May 2021

BB U OK? (stylized as bb u ok?) is the second studio album by the Dutch musician San Holo, released on 4 June 2021 through Bitbird and Counter Records.

== Production ==
The album was recorded from September 2019 to January 2020. Similarly to Album1, it was recorded in an Airbnb in Los Angeles, this time in Echo Park. He explained: "I wrote BB U OK? during a new chapter of my life after that relationship ended. I was learning how to deal with what happens 'after love'. I flew to LA and just started writing and writing, trying to express everything I had been feeling for the last few months. The change in scenery definitely helped, going back to LA (like I did for album1) brought back some good memories of that previous chapter." San Holo expected to release the album still in 2020, but that was not possible due to the COVID-19 pandemic.

== Composition ==
"When I wrote this album, I was obviously feeling different things than I do now, over a year later. However, I think there’s always a sense of nostalgia in my music. Nostalgia is something I’m always inspired by. A lot of my songs are about looking back while still moving forward at the same time. They’re about accepting that everything is fleeting and understanding the beauty in that, too. This is something that I’m always thinking about. In that sense this album still really feels like me, even though I wrote it over a year ago."

—San Holo to Billboard.

In an interview, San Holo declared that BB U OK? was his most personal project ever, which is "just me trying to experiment in a more indie direction, keeping the same sonic elements and feelings as a San Holo song." He also declared that, while Album1 was "me being in love", BB U OK? "definitely has an after love vibe. Not to say a bad vibe, but more like an 'Okay, what happens after that relationship and how do you deal with it, how do you move on?' The bittersweetness of that, the beautiful memories yet the sad fact that it didn't work out, for example."

San Holo declared the album is "post-EDM, with influences from indie and post-rock."

The album's title is "a reminder to ask others how they're feeling". San Holo further clarified that he felt that, even though everyone was connected with social media and phones, "I feel like we're so disconnected in a way".

== Release ==
The album's first single, "BB U OK?", was released on 1 December 2020. On 3 February 2021, he announced BB U OK? and released a second single, "Find Your Way". He then released "It Hurts!" on 10 March, and "Black and White / My Fault" on 14 April. On 6 May, San Holo announced that the album was delayed to 4 June. On 22 May, he released "You've Changed, I've Changed", with Chet Porter. On 24 May, he announced a North American tour to promote the album.

BB U OK? was released on 4 June 2021. It was available on vinyl, cassette tape and CD formats.

== Reception ==
Professional ratings
Review scores
Source	Rating
PopMatters	7/10
de Volkskrant	4/5 stars

OOR said the album has "great songs" and declared: "BB U OK? perhaps breathes the attic room where Sander van Dijck learned to play the guitar rather than the dance floors where San Holo triumphed. Of course, that could be completely different on the third." de Volkskrant gave the album a 4 out of 5 rating. PopMatters said "almost every track plays out like its own self-contained grief cycle, with sadness turning to anger followed by a beautiful release that is ultimately cathartic."

== Track listing ==
All tracks are engineered and mixed by Sander van Dijck; "The Great Clown Pagliacci" also mixed by Tim Biesta. BB U OK? Deluxe engineers listed below.

BB U OK? track listing
No.	Title	Writer(s)	Producer(s)	Length
1.	"I Am Thinking of You"	Sander van Dijck; Aaron Carmack	San Holo; Mr. Carmack	1:30
2.	"It Hurts!"	van Dijck; Rutger van Woudenberg	San Holo	3:48
3.	"New One" (featuring Bipolar Sunshine)	van Dijck; van Woudenberg; Adio Marchant; Taine Greening	San Holo; Hundaes	3:39
4.	"BB U OK?"	van Dijck; van Woudenberg	San Holo; The Nicholas	3:22
5.	"Black and White"	van Dijck; van Woudenberg	San Holo; The Nicholas	4:01
6.	"I Just Wanna Fucking Cry" (featuring The Nicholas)	van Dijck; van Woudenberg; Greening; Annie Schindel; Daan Havenith; Steve James	San Holo; The Nicholas; Hundaes	2:54
7.	"Heal (↑%)"	van Dijck; van Woudenberg; Tim Biesta	San Holo; The Nicholas	3:42
8.	"Lonely in LA"	van Dijck; van Woudenberg	San Holo; The Nicholas	2:58
9.	"The Great Clown Pagliacci"	van Dijck; van Woudenberg; Benjamin Hudson McIldowie; Goody Grace; Stephen Feigenbaum	San Holo; McIldowie; Johan Lenox	1:28
10.	"I Get Lonely Around People, Too"	van Dijck; van Woudenberg; Stuart Thomas	San Holo; Mountain Range	5:37
11.	"Thoughts and Chemicals" (featuring American Football)	van Dijck; Michael Kinsella; Nathan Kinsella; Stephen Michael Holmes; Steven Lamos	San Holo	4:24
12.	"My Fault"	van Dijck; van Woudenberg	San Holo; The Nicholas	5:22
13.	"Make This Moment Last"	van Dijck; van Woudenberg; Biesta	San Holo	3:16
14.	"Find Your Way" (featuring Bipolar Sunshine)	van Dijck; van Woudenberg; Marchant	San Holo	3:45
15.	"Do You See Me?"	van Dijck; Greening	San Holo; Hundaes	3:26
16.	"Feels Right"	van Dijck; van Woudenberg; Thomas Michael Henry Smith	San Holo	4:18
17.	"Ewing Street"	van Dijck; van Woudenberg	San Holo; The Nicholas	2:18
18.	"Wheels Up" (featuring Weezer)	van Dijck; Rivers Cuomo	San Holo	3:17
19.	"You've Changed, I've Changed" (featuring Chet Porter)	van Dijck; van Woudenberg; Chet Porter	San Holo; The Nicholas; Porter	5:12
20.	"One More Day" (featuring Mija and Mr. Carmack)	van Dijck; van Woundenberg; Carmack	San Holo; Carmack	4:39
Total length:				72:56

BB U OK? Deluxe track listing (volume one)
No.	Title	Writer(s)	Producer(s)	Length
21.	"I Don't Feel Anything Anymore"	van Dijck; van Woundenberg	San Holo	6:15
Total length:				79:11

BB U OK? Deluxe track listing (volume two)
No.	Title	Writer(s)	Engineer	Length
1.	"Find Your Way" (featuring Bipolar Sunshine; San Holo lo-fi remix)	van Dijck; van Woudenberg; Marchant	San Holo	3:51

Notes

- Tracks are stylized in all lowercase, except "It Hurts!", "My Fault", and "Feels Right" which are stylized in all caps, and "Lonely in LA" and "The Great Clown Pagliacci" which are stylized "lonely in LA" and "the great clown Pagliacci" respectively.

== Charts ==
Chart (2021)	Peak position
US Top Album Sales (Billboard)	46
US Top Dance Albums (Billboard)	3
US Heatseekers Albums (Billboard)	5
