= Light (San Holo song) =

2016 future bass single

Single by San Holo
- Released: 22 November 2016
- Recorded: 2016
- Genre: Future bass; melodic dubstep
- Length: 3:59
- Label: Bitbird
- Songwriters: Sander van Dijck, Tessa Douwstra, Arie Storm
- Producer: Sander van Dijck

San Holo singles chronology
"OK!" (2016)	"Light" (2016)	"Lines of the Broken" (2017)

"Light" is a future bass song by Dutch producer San Holo with uncredited vocals by Dutch vocalist Tessa Douwstra. The song was released via Holo's label Bitbird on 22 November 2016 and peaked at 13 on Billboard's Dance chart and has been certified gold in the United States.

== Reception ==
Katey Ceccarelli of Earmilk called the song "multifaceted". Run the Trap praised the "beautiful, catchy vocals into an incredible drop". Harrison Kefford of Interns stated: "It’s [a] classic...San Holo showcase with its dreamy and sparkly synths and heavenly vocal work."

== Music video ==
A music video for Light was released in May 2017. The music video features a young adult couple with supernatural powers who burn when in contact with natural light. The video ends with the pair watching a solar eclipse.

== Track listings ==
Digital download – Single
No.	Title	Length
1.	"Light"	3:59
Total length:		3:59

Digital download – Remixes
No.	Title	Length
1.	"Light"	4:00
2.	"Light" (Wrld Remix)	3:29
3.	"Light" (Taska Black Remix)	3:32
4.	"Light" (ILiveHere Remix)	3:09
5.	"Light" (Eastghost Remix)	4:15
6.	"Light" (Grant Remix)	3:15
7.	"Light" (Loosid Remix)	3:51
8.	"Light" (BeauDamian Remix)	3:22
9.	"Light" (GoSlo Remix)	5:02
10.	"Light" (Deon Custom Remix)	3:48
11.	"Light" (Dave Winnel Remix)	3:18
12.	"Light" (Sonny Fodera Remix)	3:59
Total length:		45:01

== Charts ==
=== Weekly charts ===
Chart (2016–2017)	Peak position
US Hot Dance/Electronic Songs (Billboard)	13

=== Year-end charts ===
Chart (2017)	Position
US Hot Dance/Electronic Songs (Billboard)	48

== Certifications ==
Region	Certification	Certified units/sales
Canada (Music Canada)	Gold	40,000^{‡}
United States (RIAA)	Gold	500,000^{‡}
^{‡} Sales+streaming figures based on certification alone.
