= McDonald Theatre =

Theater and music venue in Eugene, Oregon, United States, a former movie theater

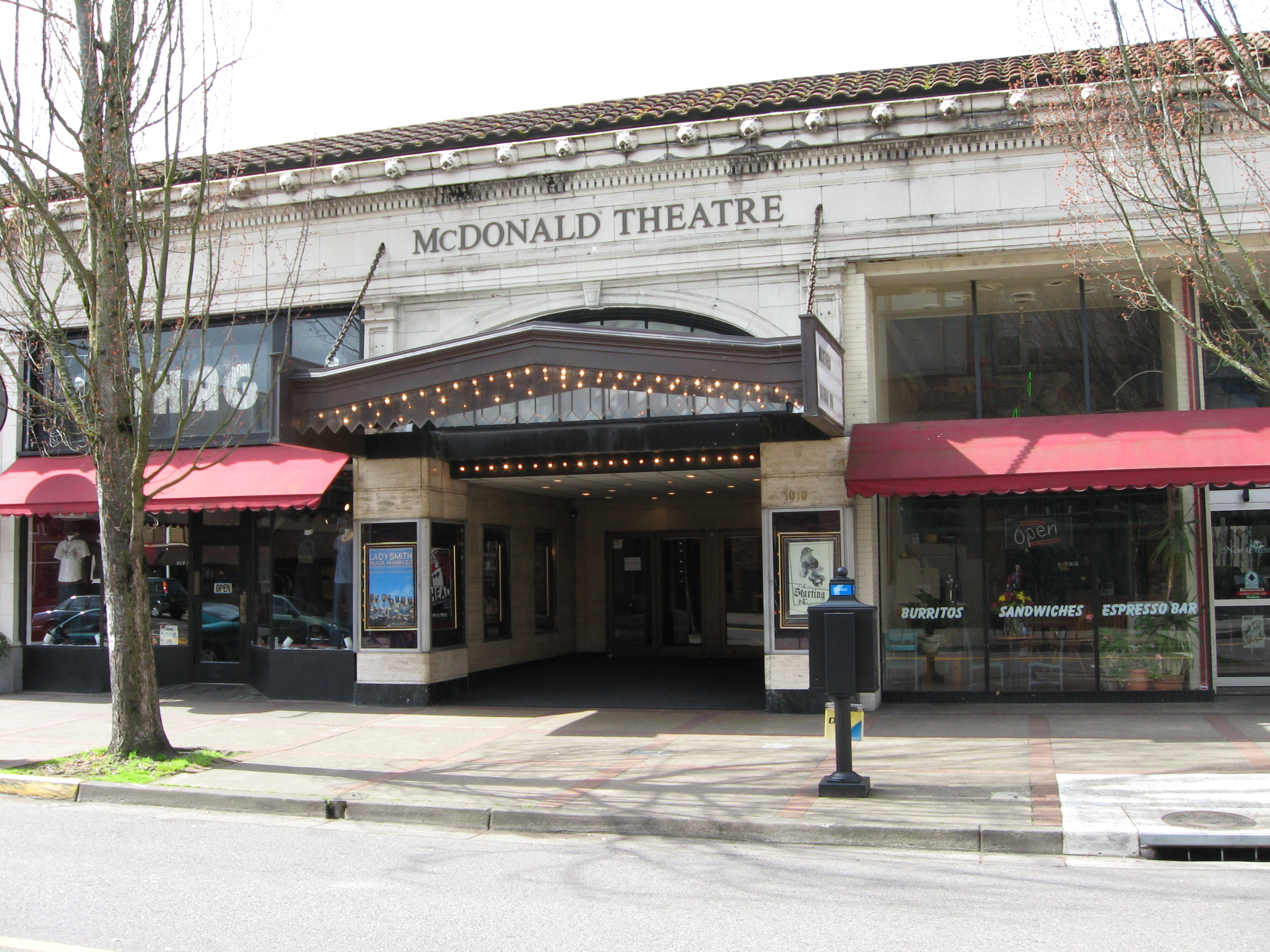
- The building's front entrance, 2008

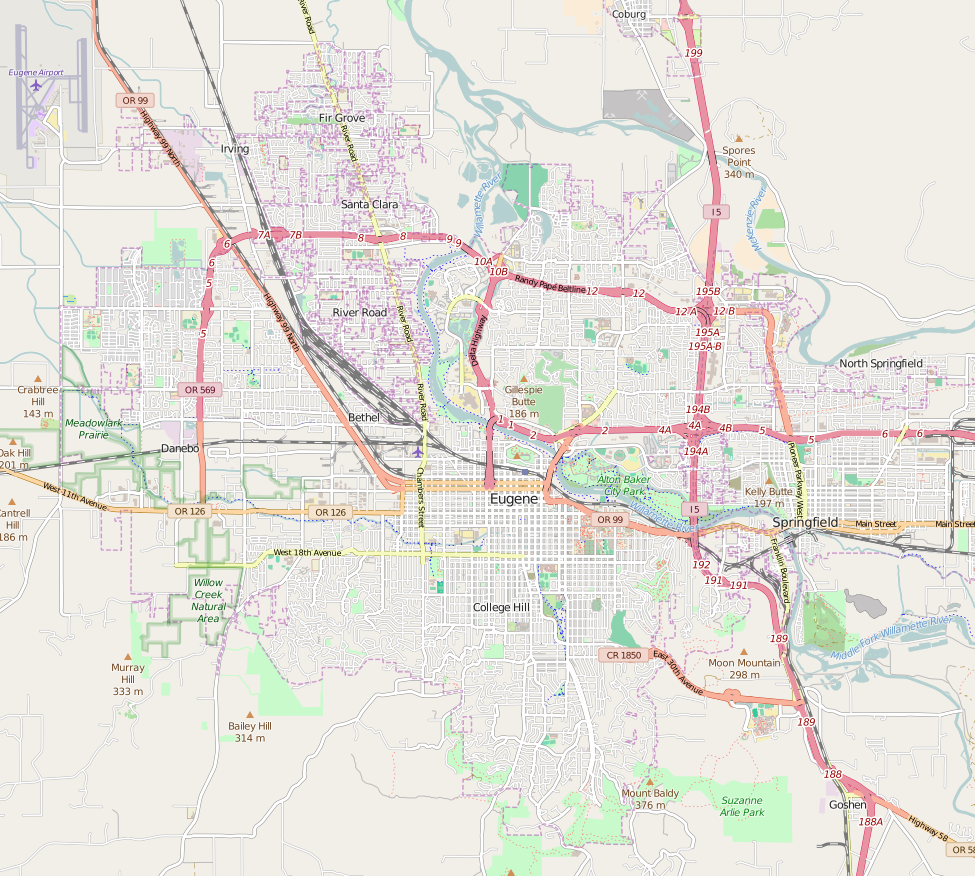
- Location in Eugene, Oregon McDonald Theatre (Oregon)
- Address: 1010 Willamette Street; Eugene, Oregon; United States
- Owner: Kesey Enterprises
- Current use: music venue

Construction
- Opened: 1925

Website
- www.mcdonaldtheatre.com
- McDonald Theater Building
- U.S. National Register of Historic Places
- Location: 1004-1044 Willamette Street; Eugene, Oregon
- Coordinates: 44.048515°N 123.09306°W
- Architect: Thomas & Mercier
- NRHP reference No.: 82003733
- Added to NRHP: 1982

McDonald Theatre is a theater and music venue in Eugene, Oregon, United States. Opened in 1925 as a movie house, the building was converted to a theater for performing arts, and is still in business. The theater is listed on the National Register of Historic Places.

== See also ==
- List of Registered Historic Places in Lane County, Oregon
- List of Registered Historic Places in Oregon
