= Existential Dance Music =

Studio album by San Holo
- Released: September 15, 2023
- Length: 50:36
- Label: Helix Records
- Producer: Lizzy Land; San Holo; What So Not; Whethan

San Holo chronology
BB U OK? (2021)	Existential Dance Music (2023)

Existential Dance Music is the third studio album by Dutch musician San Holo, released on September 15, 2023, through Helix Records.

== Background and production ==
According to San Holo, Existential Dance Music's idea was sparked by his inner journey while trying to find the reason for anxiety attacks and panic attacks that he was experiencing at the time: "I started to realize if my mind creates this stress, and it can have such an impact on my entire body, my entire being, who am I really?", adding that "'Who am I?' is one of the most existential questions you can ask yourself". In a press release, San Holo said that Existential Dance Music "is all about this journey through life. Our journey to light. The lows, the highs, the hellos, the goodbyes."

== Release and promotion ==
Existential Dance Music's first single, "All The Highs", was released on September 16, 2022. The second single, "Don't Look Down", with Lizzy Land, was released on January 27, 2023. The third single, "Bring Back the Color", with Aurora, was released on June 2, 2023, the same day the album was officially announced. Eleven days later, San Holo announced a North American tour to promote the album, set to start on September 27. The fourth single, "Tiny Flowers", was released on July 7, 2023. The fifth single, "No Place is Too Far", with Whethan and Selah Sol, was released on August 18, 2023.

== Track listing ==
Existential Dance Music track listing
No.	Title	Writer(s)	Producer(s)	Length
1.	"IDK Who I Am"	Sander van Dijck	San Holo	1:14
2.	"Don't Look Down" (featuring Lizzy Land)	van Dijck; Elizabeth Mary Land; Henry Steinway	San Holo; Lizzy Land	3:16
3.	"Tiny Flowers"	van Dijck	San Holo	4:04
4.	"Silence in My Mind" (featuring Sofie Winterson)	van Dijck; Rutger van Woudenberg	San Holo	2:53
5.	"Bring Back the Color" (featuring Aurora)	van Dijck; Aurora Aksnes; Andrew Heringer; Magnus Skylstad; Mary Weitz	San Holo	2:48
6.	"IMYSM"	van Dijck	San Holo	3:25
7.	"Always Us" (featuring Lizzy Land)	van Dijck; Land	San Holo	3:33
8.	"Dive In Deeper"	van Dijck; Land	San Holo	1:19
9.	"I'm Sorry" (featuring Sofie Winterson)	van Dijck	San Holo	4:05
10.	"No Place is Too Far" (featuring Whethan & Selah Sol)	van Dijck; Ethan Snoreck; Kareen Lomax; Neil Ormandy	San Holo; Whethan	3:00
11.	"Energy" (featuring What So Not)	van Dijck; Christopher Emerson	San Holo; What So Not	3:52
12.	"Light Only" (featuring Bipolar Sunshine)	van Dijck; van Woudenberg; Adio Marchant	San Holo	4:01
13.	"Shine" (featuring Lizzy Land)	van Dijck; Land	San Holo	4:06
14.	"All the Highs"	van Dijck; van Woudenberg	San Holo	3:26
15.	"A Moment of Truth"	van Dijck	San Holo	5:27
Total length:				50:36

Notes

- Tracks are stylized in all caps.

== Release history ==
Release history for Existential Dance Music
Region	Date	Format(s)	Label
Worldwide	September 15, 2023	Digital download; streaming; vinyl	Helix Records
