= Yvette Young =

American musician

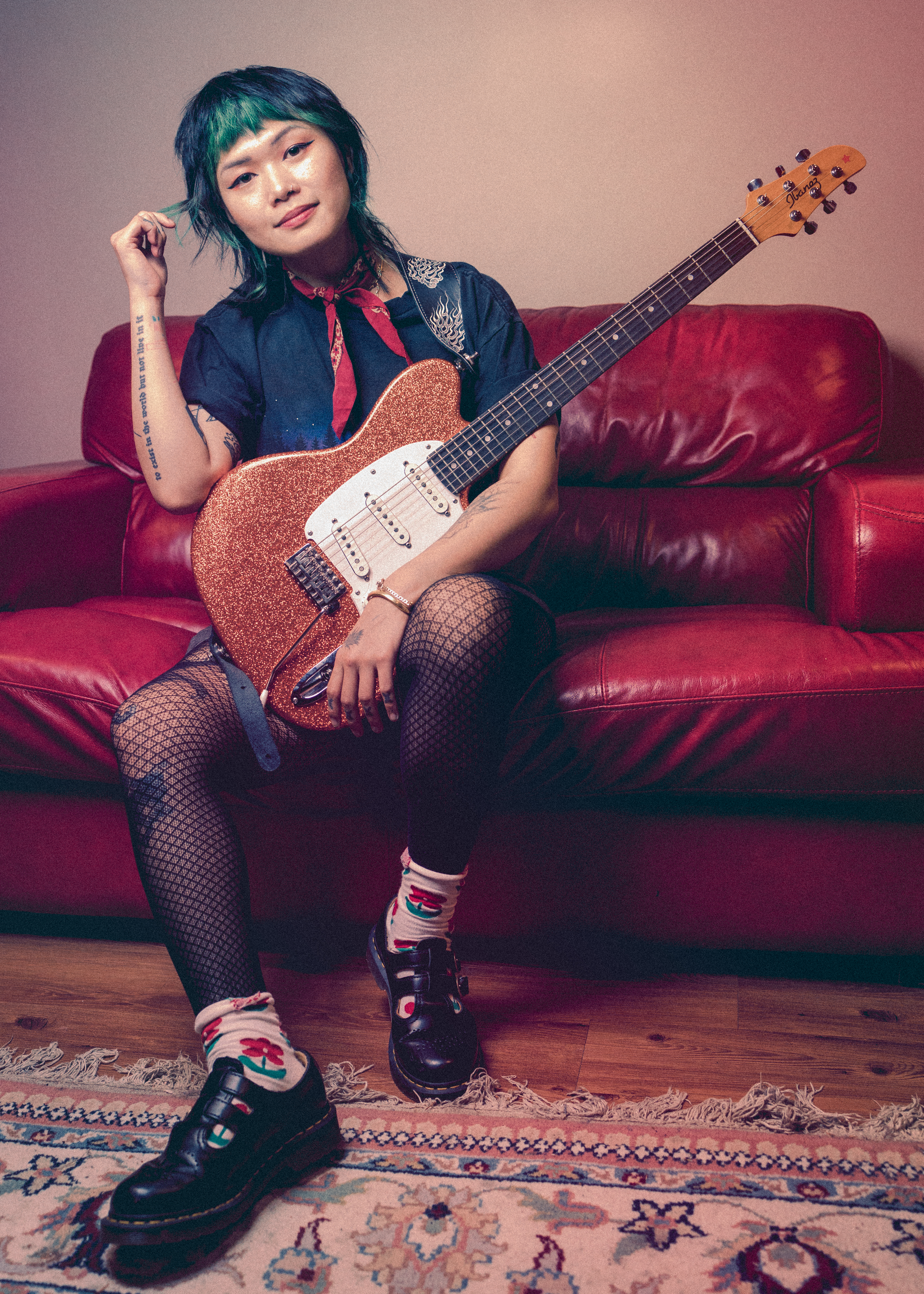
- Young in 2022

Background information
- Born: June 28, 1991 (age 34); San Jose, California, U.S.
- Genres: Math rock; art rock; progressive rock
- Occupations: Musician; composer
- Instruments: Guitar; violin; piano; vocals
- Years active: 2009–present
- Member of: Covet

Yvette Young (born June 28, 1991) is an American musician from San Jose, California. She is the front-woman for the math rock band Covet. In 2023, Rolling Stone named Young the 155th greatest guitarist of all time.

== History ==
Young is of Chinese heritage and comes from a musical family: Her father Phil is a singer, accordionist, and composer, and her mother is an organist and accordionist. She began taking piano lessons at the age of four, and violin lessons at the age of seven. She graduated from University of California, Los Angeles with a Bachelor of Fine Arts and began her career by posting videos of herself playing music in 2009. In 2014, Young released an EP, Acoustics EP and further expanded her discography with the release of a split EP with Natalie Evans in 2015. In June 2017, Young released a second EP Acoustics EP 2.

Young used her background in piano to use polyphony on a guitar. She taught herself guitar by ear after being hospitalized for an eating disorder. She notes, "I write with my ear, so I’m not really in a box in terms of chord shapes. And I don’t use [traditional] shapes at all, which freaks a lot of people out! I have a million different tunings I work in too so I didn’t really put in the time to learn every shape in every tuning, that would be ridiculous". She uses a technique of singing the part out loud and then replicating it on guitar to decipher the parts of the songs she writes.

Young also creates unique illustration and art pieces, including work on some of her own guitars. One of her paintings serves as the cover for her band's album Technicolor, released in June 2020. She has also painted Willow Smith's guitar.

Young has begun to teach a master course on guitar and finds that her style resonates with many of her students. Before this she was mainly an art teacher, but by teaching while on tour she has become a music teacher.

Young was featured in a Super Bowl LV Commercial in February 2021 for Logitech. She is also featured on their website as a partner with tutorials and tips on how to use their equipment.

Young was featured in the song "Tongue Tied" on Gone Are The Good Days by Chunk! No, Captain Chunk!.

In July 2025, Young confirmed that she contributed to the soundtrack for the James Gunn-directed Superman film, and posted some highlights to her social media.

== Influences ==
Young has cited an array of guitarists who have influenced her style, including Tim Collis of TTNG, Joe Reinhart of Algernon Cadwallader, Mike Kinsella of American Football, Robert Smith of the Cure, Steve Vai and Eddie Van Halen.

== Gear ==
As of 2019, Young plays two Ibanez Talman Prestige guitars with Seymour Duncan Five-Two single-coil pickups also a newer variant with two P90’s and custom sparkle finishes, and a 7-string, fanned-fret Strandberg that she has painted. During the 2020 NAMM Show, Ibanez announced her signature model, the YY10, a Strat-style Talman electric guitar. Her second signature model, the YY20, was released in late 2021; she calls it the YY20 OCS (Orange-Cream Sparkle). She also plays a Yamaha A5R acoustic-electric guitar.

Young plays through Vox AC amps. Her touring amp is an AC30. On her Catharsis album, this was joined by a Roland JC-40.

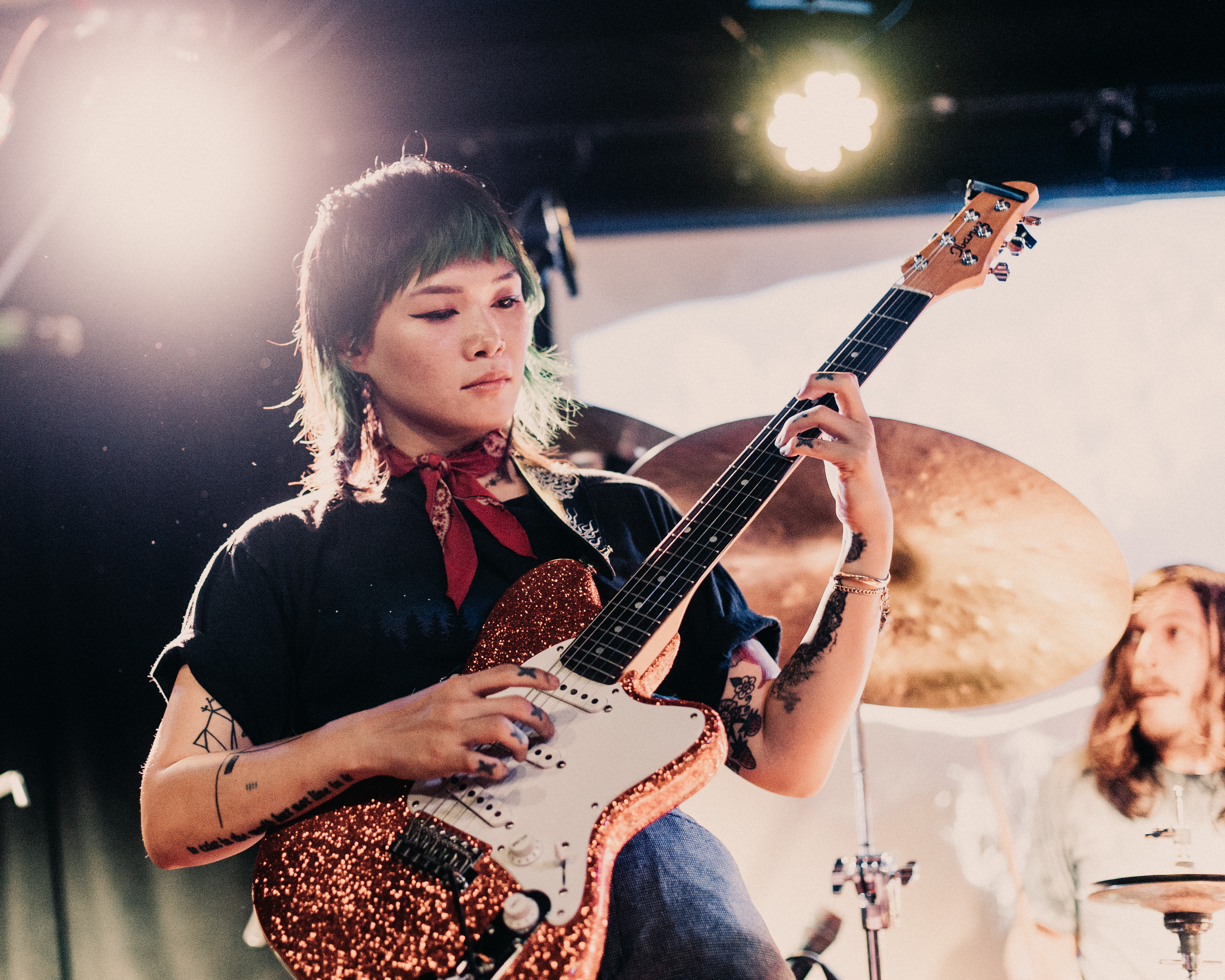
Young performing with Covet in 2022

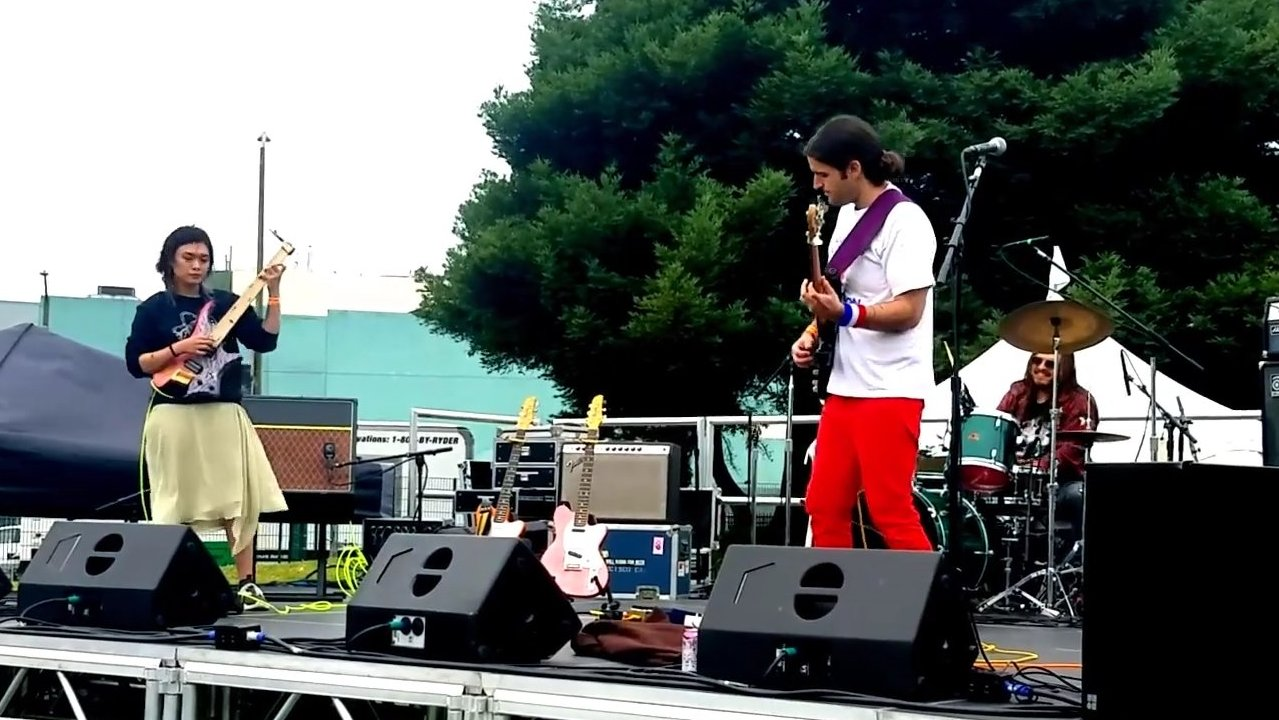
Young performing with Covet, 2019

== Discography ==
=== Solo discography ===
Extended plays

- Acoustics EP (2014)
- Yvette Young/Natalie Evans Split (2015)
- Acoustics EP 2 (2017)
- Piano EP (2019)

Singles

- "Sojourner" (2017)
- "Rivulets" (2018)
- "Cars and Girls" (2020)
- "Sprout" (2020)
- "Simple and Clean" (2021)
- "Always" (2024)

=== Covet discography ===
Albums

- Effloresce (2018)
- Technicolor (2020)
- Catharsis (2023)

Extended plays

- Currents (2015)
- Covet on Audiotree Live (2016)
- Acoustics (2019)

=== Film Soundtrack ===
- Superman (2025) - contributed to the film's soundtrack
