= San Holo =

Dutch DJ (born 1990)

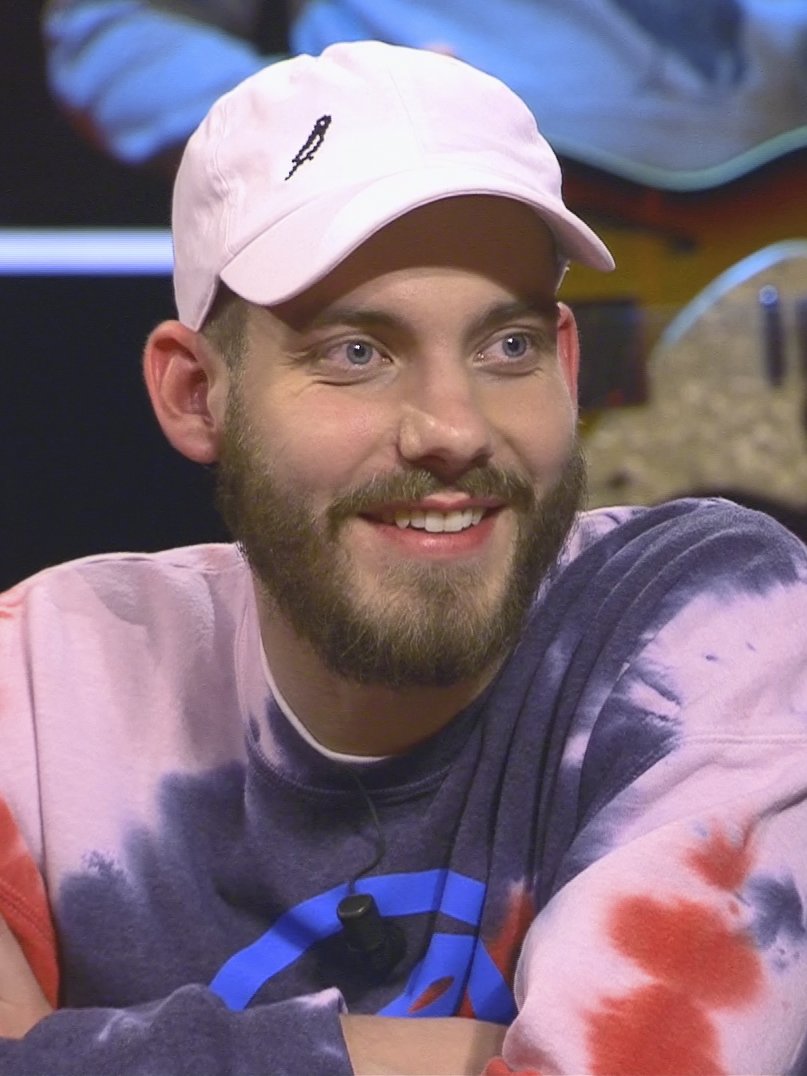
- San Holo in 2018

Background information
- Also known as: Casilofi
- Born: Sander van Dijck; 26 November 1990 (age 35); Zoetermeer, South Holland, Netherlands
- Genres: Trap; future bass; ambient; future riddim
- Occupations: Musician; producer; songwriter; DJ
- Instruments: Ableton Live); guitar; vocals
- Years active: 2013–present
- Labels: Columbia; Heroic Recordings; Monstercat; Spinnin'; Bitbird; Owsla; Counter Records
- Website: sanholo.com

San Holo's logo

Sander van Dijck (born 26 November 1990), better known by his stage name San Holo, is a Dutch DJ, musician, songwriter and record producer from Zoetermeer. He gained international recognition for his remix of Dr. Dre's "The Next Episode", which currently has over 281 million views on YouTube. He has released music on several record labels including Spinnin' Records, Owsla, Barong Family, and Monstercat. He also founded Bitbird, a label which has released several of his singles including "Still Looking" and "Light" and his debut album Album1. San Holo's first EP, Cosmos, was released via Heroic on 18 September 2014 and was in the Top 100 Electronic category of iTunes. San Holo's first album, Album1, was released via Bitbird on 21 September 2018 and debuted at #7 on the Billboard Dance/Electronic Albums chart.

In 2017, San Holo was nominated at the Electronic Music Awards for New Artist of the Year. His second studio album, BB U OK? was released on 4 June 2021. On 15 September 2023, he released his third studio album, Existential Dance Music.

== Background ==
Van Dijck studied music production and guitar at Codarts. He graduated in 2012. After years of working with bands, Van Dijck began ghost producing for DJs. His production experienced considerable commercial success, which led him to consider going solo and creating the stage name, San Holo.

== History ==
=== 2013–2014: Early EPs, Heroic Recordings and Walt Disney Pictures ===
In early 2013, Van Dijck released his debut EP, Corellia. Later that year in October, he released his second EP, Demons. These first two EPs have since been removed from streaming services. He began to gain attention in 2014, when he was signed by Heroic Recordings. Cosmos EP was released on 18 September 2014 and was in the Top 100 Electronic category of iTunes.

In September 2014, Walt Disney Pictures threatened a lawsuit against Van Dijck. They thought his stage name San Holo was too similar to Han Solo, a character in the Star Wars movies. However, he won the case and was allowed to continue using the name.

In November, he released a remix of Dr. Dre's "The Next Episode", which has over 258 million views on YouTube.

=== 2015–2016: OWSLA, Spinnin, Monstercat, bitbird ===
On 4 May 2015, he released a song called "Victory" on Monstercat. On 25 May 2015, he also released a music video of his song "Hold Fast" in Monstercat; both songs become part of Monstercat's 22nd album titled Contact and San Holo's Victory EP, also from Monstercat. On 4 September 2015, he released a video of his single with Father Dude called "IMISSU" on Spinnin' Records. On 2 October 2015, he released a remix of Porter Robinson's song titled "Natural Light". The remix became a part of Robinson's Worlds Remixed album.

On 26 January 2016, he released a single with Yellow Claw named "Alright" through Owsla. This was Van Dijck's second song on OWSLA, after "Smile On Your Face" in 2015 with the French group Point Point. "Alright" later became a part of a compilation album by OWSLA called OWSLA Worldwide Broadcast.

On 23 February 2016, Van Dijck released his single "We Rise" on OWSLA's NEST HQ imprint. This song would go on to become one of his most successful releases, reaching 60 million Spotify streams and over 100 million views on YouTube.

On 11 March 2016, he released the New Sky EP, with a second single and music video on Monstercat called "They Just Haven't Seen It", featuring The Nicholas. This, as well as the EP title track, became part of Monstercat's 026 – Resistance. On 5 June 2016, he teased an unreleased song "RAW", which appeared as the background track of the credits in Episode 7 of Season 3 in the American comedy series Silicon Valley. It was then fully released on 19 July 2016.

On 7 June 2016, he released a single named "Still Looking" on his own label bitbird. On 22 November 2016, he released his single "Light" on bitbird which debuted on #38 on the Billboard Hot Dance/Electronic Songs the week of 17 December 2016. The following week it made the highest gains on the chart rising 12 spots to #26 following a strong streaming performance. The next week it continued to climb to #19 for the tracking week of 31 December 2016 after continued streaming performance. The track reached its peak position at #13 on 11 February 2017, after climbing up from the 27th position the week before. "Light" spent a total of 20 weeks on the Hot Dance/Electronic chart. It has since surpassed 100 million streams on Spotify.

=== 2017–2019: Album1 and Casilofi ===
On 25 April 2017, he released an acoustic version of his hit song "We Rise". Two months later, on 30 June 2017 he released "The Future", his first single in 2017. The song featured musician James Vincent McMorrow.

On 12 September 2017, van Dijck released his second single of 2017, titled "I Still See Your Face" featuring his own vocals, followed by the remixes of the song on 31 October 2017. His last single of 2017 was his song titled "One Thing", which he released on 17 November 2017. The final release of 2017 for van Dijck was his EP titled The Trip, released on 26 December 2017.

He released the first volume of remixes to his single "One Thing" on 12 January 2018. The second volume of remixes to his single "One Thing" was released on 9 February 2018. Both volumes of the remixes were released on van Dijck's record label Bitbird.

On 1 May 2018, through to early July 2018, van Dijck uploaded videos containing behind-the-scenes footage of upcoming songs, later revealed to be part of an upcoming album. On 26 July 2018 he released a video announcing the debut album, titled Album1. On 3 August 2018, he released two singles from the upcoming album on Bitbird titled "Worthy" and "Lift Me from the Ground", while also announcing an upcoming tour for the album. "Lift Me from the Ground" also debuted at #42 on the Billboard Hot Dance/Electronic Songs during the week of 18 August 2018. 31 August saw the release of another single from the album, "Brighter Days", featuring singer Bipolar Sunshine, along with an official lyric video for the track. Pre-orders for Album1 were opened on 7 September 2018, alongside an announcement of a release date of 21 September for the album on San Holo's Twitter. Another single from Album1 was released on 14 September 2018 – "Forever Free" featuring Duskus. In the week leading up to the album's release on 21 September, two more singles from the album were released by van Dijck – "Surface" featuring post-rock band Caspian with uncredited vocals by Fazerdaze on the 17th, and "Voices In My Head" featuring The Nicholas on the 19th.

Upon launch, the album topped the iTunes Electronic Charts in various countries including the United States and Canada. The next week, Album1 debuted at #7 on the Billboard Dance/Electronic Albums chart for the week of 6 October 2018, landing van Dijck his first top 10 album. Simultaneously, three songs from Album1 entered the Dance/Electronic Songs chart for the tracking week of 6 October 2018; "Lift Me from the Ground" re-entered the charts at #39, while "Show Me" and "Brighter Days" debuted at #42 and #49 respectively.

On 28 December 2018, van Dijck announced the revival of Casilofi, his first ever music project before San Holo. This announcement came following teasers on his various social media accounts, and released the EP "Create, Create, Create" on the same day, which consisted of 4 released and remastered tracks from the original project.

On 22 February 2019, he released the single "Lead Me Back". According to the producer, "it's the most personal song that I ever wrote". On 13 June 2019, van Dijck released "Lost Lately". On 28 September 2019, exactly one year and one week after the release of Album1, Holo released the commentary album Album1 (Commentary).

On 17 December 2019, van Dijck announced the release of a remix album: Album1 (A Lot Of Remixes). It was released 3 days later.

The 15-track album Album1 (A Lot of Remixes) featured many up and coming acts as well as friends of van Dijck's. Released on 20 December 2019, the album included remixes such as: "everything matters (when it comes to you)" remixed by Aiobahn and Laxcity along with "Lift Me from the Ground" remixed by Jaron and Manilla Killa, and Phuture Noize, "show me" remixed by The Nicholas, "brighter days" remixed by Atmozfears and Duumu, "always on my mind" remixed by MELVV, "go back in time" remixed by EMBRZ, Rootkit, and Skygate, "love (wip)" remixed by Tails, "voice in my head" remixed by Flaws, "worth" remixed by Prblm Chld, "forever free" remixed by Janee, "surface" remixed by Former Hero, and "vestal avenue" remixed by Golden Vessel.

=== 2020–present: Stay Vibrant and BB U OK? ===
Following van Dijck's Album1 (A Lot Of Remixes) release, on 31 January 2020 he released "Honest" featuring Broods. The track entered the US Billboard Hot Dance/Electronic Songs chart on 15 February 2020 and stayed there for eight weeks, making its way to number 25. "Honest" also charted on the Dance/Mix Show Airplay chart. The accompanying music video shows the theme of self-referential irony and van Dijck's struggle with false expectation and self-preservation. On 10 April 2020 he released three remixes for "Honest" by Midnight Kids, Lunice, and 220 Kid.

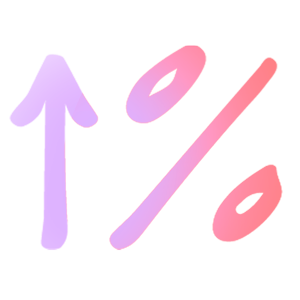

On van Dijck's social media activity fans have noticed he has adopted the phrase "stay vibrant" and the use of the "%" sign to express his mood and emotions (blessed % / the sacred %) with his fans. van Dijck aims to embrace the fact that not all days are equally "vibrant" and emphasizes that life is all about ups and downs. The percentage sign is used as a mood meter, and he encourages his fans to use it to show how blessed they are feeling that day, without having to put it into words.

During the Coronavirus pandemic in Spring of 2020, San Holo started the rollout of his Stay Vibrant (stylized as stay vibrant) EP. Released on his label Bitbird, the EP consists of seven singles: "(if only i could) hold you", "don't forget to breathe today", "in the end i just want you to be happy", "idk anything (demo)", "in case i never see you again…", "we're all just on our way home", and "staring at the sea without you next to me". Artists such as Analogue Dear, ILIVEHERE, and Luwten are featured on the EP. The project was inspired by van Dijck looking for a way to express his emotions and connect with fans while in quarantine.

During this time to stay engaged with his audience, van Dijck streamed weekly on Twitch (service). He also premiered footage from past live shows such as his performance at Red Rocks Amphitheatre in June 2019, Electric Daisy Carnival in 2017, and Lollapalooza in 2019. San Holo also participated in his independent record label's first ever livestream, "a day with bitbird", featured on Diplo's Revolution on SiriusXM.

In May 2020, San Holo premiered many of the songs from the Stay Vibrant EP at Porter Robinson's Secret Sky online music festival. Money raised from the festival was donated to the MusiCares COVID-19 Relief Fund.

On 5 November 2020, San Holo announced social media hiatus, "to clear my mind and live in the moment a little more". He also declared: "Let's start a new chapter soon!" 21 days later, he announced the release of the single "BB U OK?" for 1 December, which started "a new chapter" in his career. The song was San Holo's first release on Counter Records.

On 27 January 2021, he teased the "biggest announcement in San Holo history", to occur on 3 February. The announcement was his second studio album, BB U OK?, along with a second single, "Find Your Way". The album was initially set to be released on 21 May via Bitbird, his own independent label, and Counter Records. He then released "It Hurts!" on 10 March, and "Black and White / My Fault" on 14 April. On 6 May, San Holo announced that the album was delayed to 4 June. On 22 May, he released "You've Changed, I've Changed", with Chet Porter. On 24 May, he announced a North American tour to promote the album.

On 17 September 2021, San Holo played the Fremont Stage at the Life Is Beautiful festival in Las Vegas, NV USA, where he played most of the BB U OK? album.

On 7 April 2022, San Holo announced a deluxe edition of BB U OK?, which includes thirteen bonus songs including an original track as well as remixes from artists such as Elohim and Chet Porter.

On 19 May 2022, the Calm meditation app launched "The Stay Vibrant Series" in collaboration with San Holo.

On 2 June 2023, he announced his third album, Existential Dance Music, which was released on 15 September 2023.

== Discography ==
- Album1 (2018)
- BB U OK? (2021)
- Existential Dance Music (2023)
- True Love in a Made Up World (2026)

== Awards and nominations ==
Year	Organization	Nominee / work	Category	Result
2017	Electronic Music Awards	San Holo	New Artist of the Year	Nominated
2019	Edison Pop	album1	Best Dance Album	Won
2019	International Dance Music Awards	San Holo	Breakthrough Artist of the Year	Won
2019	International Dance Music Awards	album1	Best Electronic Album	Won
2019	International Dance Music Awards	San Holo	Best Male Artist (Bass)	Nominated
