= Bitbird =

Dutch independent record label

- A Gouldian finch is the Bitbird logo
- Type: Record label
- Industry: Music industry
- Genre: Electronic dance music; future bass; trap; electronica
- Founded: 2013; 13 years ago
- Founders: Sander van Dijck; Thorwald van den Akker
- Headquarters: The Hague, South Holland, Netherlands
- Key people: Sander van Dijck; Thorwald van den Akker; Budi Voogt
- Website: bitbirdofficial.com

Bitbird (stylised as bitbird) is a Dutch independent record label and creative company based in The Hague, Netherlands founded by Sander van Dijck in 2014. The label is jointly run by Sander van Dijck's manager Budi Voogt and his longtime friend and associate Thorwald van den Akker, who is also the label's creative director and co-founder.

While Bitbird is known primarily for releasing the electronic dance music subgenre future bass, they have also released a wide variety of genres including classical music, R&B, trap, and electronica.

Bitbird is most known for releasing music by artists such as San Holo, Droeloe, Taska Black, Duskus, and BeauDamian.

== History ==
The label was founded in mid-2014 by childhood friends Sander van Dijck and Thorwald van den Akker. van Dijck stated that one of the reasons for starting the label was because 'no label has ever given me [him] that full creative control I crave.'

On 30 July 2014, they released their first single "The First Route" by Duskus which they redistributed on 29 October 2015.

On 15 July 2016, the label released its first ever compilation album "Gouldian Finch" with lead single "Still Looking" by San Holo. "Still Looking" was released on 7 June 2016 and topped the Hype Machine charts for original releases shortly after its release.

On 22 November 2016, the label released the single "Light" by San Holo which topped the Hype Machine charts shortly after its release. It also debuted on the Billboard Hot Dance/Electronic songs in #38 the tracking week of 17 December 2016 before rising to #26 the following tracking week and breaking into the top 20 the week of 31 December. "Light" marked the first bitbird and San Holo release to chart on any Billboard charts.

== Artists ==
- Vic Alexis
- Amnes
- Analogue Dear
- Ark Patrol
- Autolaser
- Ayelle
- Barking Continues
- BeauDamian
- Taska Black
- Byegone
- Cassini
- Sam Day
- Deon Custom
- Chelsea Cutler
- Daktyl
- Darby
- Dobi
- Dossyx
- Dot
- Droeloe
- Duskus
- DZZ
- Eastghost
- Flaws
- Greyhat
- JB Hain
- Pauline Herr
- Hundaes
- ILiveHere.
- Inflake
- JoeGarratt
- Just a Gent
- Juuku
- Kalulu
- Kasbo
- Knapsack
- Laxcity
- Losi
- Marcioz
- James Vincent McMorrow
- Melvv
- Ian Munro
- N33t
- Nevve
- The Nicholas
- Oblvyn
- OddKidOut
- Molly Otto
- Purge
- Ramzoid
- Rome in Silver
- San Holo
- Scro
- Skygate
- Slow Shudder
- Sumthin Sumthin
- Synova
- Tails
- Tisoki
- vinZere
- Wavedash
- Wes Mills
- Zes
