= Skrillex discography =

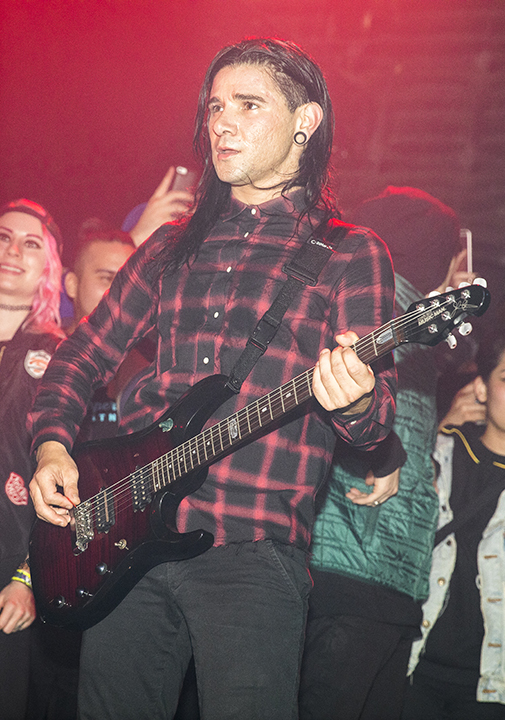
- Skrillex (2017)
- Studio albums: 5
- Extended plays: 10
- Singles: 46
- Music videos: 54

American DJ and music producer Skrillex has released five studio albums, ten extended plays, 46 singles (including 17 as a featured artist), and 54 music videos.

After departing the post-hardcore band From First to Last, he released his debut extended play, Gypsyhook, on April 7, 2009, through Atlantic Records as Sonny Moore. He then began producing music under the pseudonym Skrillex, released a second extended play, My Name Is Skrillex, as a free download from his Myspace page. The release was succeeded by a single, "Weekends!!!", featuring Sirah, which was released on October 25, 2010, in the United States. Skrillex rose to fame in late 2010 when he released a third EP, Scary Monsters and Nice Sprites on October 22 through labels mau5trap and Big Beat Records. The release saw moderate success, peaking at number 49 on the Billboard 200 and receiving an award for Best Dance/Electronica Album at the 54th Grammy Awards. The album's title track, also released as the lead single, saw international acclaim, receiving an award for Best Dance Recording at the aforementioned ceremony, and peaking at number 69 on the Billboard Hot 100. Moore's remix of "Cinema" by Benny Benassi also won a Grammy Award for Best Remixed Recording, Non-Classical.

On June 7, 2011, Skrillex released a fourth EP, More Monsters and Sprites, which primarily featured remixes of previous tracks. The release charted in the lower regions on the Billboard 200, spawning the singles "First of the Year (Equinox)", which reached number 85 on the Hot 100 and "Ruffneck (Full Flex)" which peaked at number 89 in the United Kingdom. In December 2011, Skrillex released Bangarang, a fifth EP, featuring collaborations with The Doors, Ellie Goulding and Wolfgang Gartner. Bangarang has since become his most commercially successful EP, peaking at number 15 on the Billboard 200, number six in Canada, number 31 in the United Kingdom, and number four in Australia. His sixth EP, Leaving, was released on January 2, 2013, exclusively to The Nest. Skrillex released his first studio album Recess in March 2014. In 2015 Moore collaborated with Diplo under the name Jack Ü, releasing a self-titled album in February of that year. On February 17 and 18, 2023, Skrillex successively released two new albums, Quest for Fire and Don't Get Too Close. On April 1, 2025, Skrillex released his fourth album, Fuck U Skrillex You Think Ur Andy Warhol but Ur Not!! <3; the album was released via Dropbox through email to a mailing list before becoming available on streaming platforms later that day.

== Studio albums ==
List of studio albums, with selected chart positions
Title	Details	Peak chart positions											Certifications
Title	Details	US	AUS	AUT	BEL (FL)	CAN	FRA	NLD	NZ	SWE	SWI	UK	Certifications
Recess	Released: March 14, 2014; Label: Owsla, Big Beat, Atlantic; Formats: CD, LP, cassette, digital download	4	4	14	28	3	57	42	6	21	11	13	MC: Gold
Quest for Fire	Released: February 17, 2023; Label: Owsla, Atlantic; Formats: CD, LP, cassette, digital download, streaming	51	33	49	119	29	159	—	8	—	57	78	
Don't Get Too Close	Released: February 18, 2023; Label: Owsla, Atlantic; Formats: CD, LP, cassette, digital download, streaming	—	—	—	—	—	—	—	—	—	—	— (Note: Don't Get Too Close did not enter the UK Albums Chart, but peaked at number 84 on the UK Album Downloads Chart.)	
Fuck U Skrillex You Think Ur Andy Warhol but Ur Not!! <3	Released: April 1, 2025; Label: Owsla, Atlantic; Formats: LP, digital download, streaming	69	—	—	194	58	—	—	29	—	—	— (Note: Fuck U Skrillex You Think Ur Andy Warhol but Ur Not!! did not enter the UK Albums Chart, but peaked at number 62 on the UK Album Downloads Chart.)	
Soma	Released: June 5, 2026; Label: Owsla, Atlantic; Formats: Digital download, streaming	—	—	—	—	—	—	—	—	—	—	—	
"—" denotes a recording that did not chart or was not released in that territory.

== Extended plays ==
List of extended plays, with selected chart positions and certifications
Title	Details	Peak chart positions										Certifications
Title	Details	US	AUS	BEL (FL)	CAN	MEX	NOR	NZ	SWE	SWI	UK	Certifications
Bells	Released: December, 2007; Label: Self-Released; Formats: Limited edition tour CD, digital download	—	—	—	—	—	—	—	—	—	—	
Gypsyhook	Released: April 7, 2009; Label: OWSLA, Atlantic; Formats: Limited edition tour CD, digital download	—	—	—	—	—	—	—	—	—	—	
My Name Is Skrillex	Released: June 7, 2010; Label: Self-released; Formats: Digital download	—	—	—	—	—	—	—	—	—	—	
Scary Monsters and Nice Sprites	Released: October 25, 2010; Label: mau5trap, Big Beat; Formats: CD, LP, digital download	49	24	—	24	—	—	15	49	—	—	RIAA: Platinum; ARIA: Platinum; MC: Platinum
More Monsters and Sprites	Released: June 7, 2011; Label: Big Beat, Atlantic; Formats: CD, LP, digital download	124	—	—	—	—	—	—	—	—	—	
Bangarang	Released: December 23, 2011; Label: OWSLA, Big Beat, Atlantic; Formats: CD, LP, digital download	14	4	89	6	21	25	3	—	47	31	RIAA: Platinum; ARIA: Platinum; MC: Platinum; AMPROFON: Platinum; RMNZ: Platinum; IFPI SWI: Platinum; BPI: Gold
Leaving	Released: January 2, 2013; Label: OWSLA, Nest; Formats: Digital download	—	—	—	—	—	—	—	—	—	—	
Show Tracks	Released: July 19, 2019; Label: OWSLA, Atlantic; Formats: Digital download	—	—	—	—	—	—	—	—	—	—	
Hit Me Where It Hurts X	Released: November 20, 2025; Label: OWSLA, Atlantic; Formats: Digital download	—	—	—	—	—	—	—	—	—	—	
Kora	Released: January 15, 2026; Label: OWSLA, Atlantic; Formats: Digital download, LP	—	—	—	—	—	—	—	—	—	—	
"—" denotes a recording that did not chart or was not released in that territory.

== Singles ==
=== As lead artist ===
List of singles as lead artist, with selected chart positions and certifications, showing year released and album name
Title	Year	Peak chart positions										Certifications	Album
Title	Year	US	US Dance	AUS	AUT	BEL (FL)	CAN	FRA	NZ	SWE	UK	Certifications	Album
"Weekends!!!" (featuring Sirah)	2010	—	— (Note: "Weekends" did not enter the Hot Dance/Electronic Songs chart, but peaked at number 25 on the Dance/Electronic Digital Song Sales chart.)	—	—	—	93	—	—	—	—	RIAA: Gold; MC: Gold	My Name is Skrillex
"Scary Monsters and Nice Sprites"	2010	69	— (Note: "Scary Monsters and Nice Sprites" did not enter the Hot Dance/Electronic Songs chart, but peaked at number four on the Dance/Electronic Digital Song Sales chart.)	56	—	—	66	71	—	20	143	RIAA: 2× Platinum; ARIA: 2× Platinum; GLF: 2× Platinum; MC: Platinum	Scary Monsters and Nice Sprites
"First of the Year (Equinox)"	2011	85	— (Note: "First of the Year (Equinox)" did not enter the Hot Dance/Electronic Songs chart, but peaked at number six on the Dance/Electronic Digital Song Sales chart.)	84	—	— (Note: "First of the Year (Equinox)" did not enter the Ultratop 50, but peaked at number seven on the Flemish Ultratip chart.)	88	187	—	19	—	RIAA: Platinum; GLF: 2× Platinum; MC: Gold; RMNZ: Platinum	More Monsters and Sprites
"Ruffneck (Full Flex)"	2011	—	—	—	—	—	—	—	—	—	89		More Monsters and Sprites
"Breakn' a Sweat" (with The Doors)	2012	—	—	—	—	— (Note: "Breakn' a Sweat" did not enter the Ultratop 50, but peaked at number 48 on the Flemish Ultratip chart.)	80	—	—	—	32		Bangarang
"Bangarang" (featuring Sirah)	2012	72	— (Note: "Bangarang" did not enter the Hot Dance/Electronic Songs chart, but peaked at number seven on the Dance/Electronic Digital Song Sales chart.)	4	25	9	26	63	14	24	24	RIAA: 3× Platinum; ARIA: 7× Platinum; BEA: Gold; BPI: Platinum; GLF: Platinum; IFPI AUT: Platinum; MC: Platinum; RMNZ: 2× Platinum	Bangarang
"Lick It" (with Kaskade)	2012	—	— (Note: "Lick It" did not enter the Hot Dance/Electronic Songs chart, but peaked at number 34 on the Dance/Electronic Digital Song Sales chart.)	—	—	—	—	—	—	—	—		Fire & Ice
"Make It Bun Dem" (with Damian "Jr. Gong" Marley)	2012	— (Note: "Make It Bun Dem" did not enter the Billboard Hot 100, but peaked at number six on the Bubbling Under Hot 100 chart.)	— (Note: "Make It Bun Dem" did not enter the Hot Dance/Electronic Songs chart, but peaked at number seven on the Dance/Electronic Digital Song Sales chart.)	27	34	15	34	87	16	48	58	RIAA: Platinum; ARIA: 2× Platinum; BPI: Silver; GLF: Platinum; MC: Gold; RMNZ: 2× Platinum	Make It Bun Dem After Hours EP
"Try It Out" (with Alvin Risk)	2013	—	19	—	—	—	—	185	—	—	—		Recess
"Ragga Bomb" (featuring Ragga Twins)	2014	—	16	—	—	— (Note: "Ragga Bomb" did not enter the Ultratop 50, but peaked at number 75 on the Flemish Ultratip chart.)	—	—	—	—	—		Recess
"Recess" (with Kill the Noise featuring Fatman Scoop and Michael Angelakos)	2014	— (Note: "Recess" did not enter the Billboard Hot 100, but peaked at number six on the Bubbling Under Hot 100 Singles chart.)	13	47	69	— (Note: "Recess" did not enter the Ultratop 50, but peaked at number 25 on the Flemish Ultratip chart.)	59	189	—	—	57		Recess
"Dirty Vibe" (with Diplo featuring G-Dragon and CL)	2014	—	15	—	—	—	—	—	—	—	—		Recess
"Burial" (with Yogi featuring Pusha T, Moody Good and TrollPhace)	2015	—	23	—	—	—	—	—	—	—	90		Non-album single
"Bun Up the Dance" (with Dillon Francis)	2015	—	32	—	—	—	—	—	—	—	—		This Mixtape Is Fire
"Squad Out!" (with Jauz featuring Fatman Scoop)	2015	—	—	—	—	—	—	—	—	—	—		Adult Swim Singles 2015
"Working for It" (with Zhu and THEY.)	2015	—	11	30	—	—	—	122	39	—	71	ARIA: Platinum; RMNZ: 2× Platinum	Genesis Series
"El Chapo" (with The Game)	2015	—	—	—	—	—	—	—	—	—	—	RIAA: Gold; RMNZ: Platinum	The Documentary 2.5
"VIP's" (with Must Die!)	2016	—	—	—	—	—	—	—	—	—	—		OWSLA Worldwide Broadcast
"Pretty Bye Bye" (with Team EZY featuring NJOMZA)	2016	—	—	—	—	—	—	—	—	—	—		OWSLA Worldwide Broadcast
"No Chill" (with Vic Mensa)	2016	—	—	—	—	—	—	—	—	—	—		Traffic
"Killa" (with Wiwek featuring Elliphant)	2016	—	—	—	—	—	—	—	—	—	—		The Free & Rebellious
"Purple Lamborghini" (with Rick Ross)	2016	33	6	39	56	— (Note: "Purple Lamborghini" did not enter the Ultratop 50, but peaked at number 36 on the Flemish Ultratip chart.)	28	58	34	— (Note: "Purple Lamborghini" did not enter the Swedish Singles Chart, but peaked at number four on the Swedish Heatseeker chart.)	61	RIAA: Platinum; ARIA: 2× Platinum; BPI: Silver; MC: Gold; RMNZ: Platinum	Suicide Squad: The Album
"Slam Dunk" (with Valentino Khan featuring Kstylis)	2016	—	—	—	—	—	—	—	—	—	—		Non-album singles
"Waiting" (with RL Grime and What So Not)	2016	—	—	—	—	—	—	—	—	—	—		Non-album singles
"Chicken Soup" (with Habstrakt)	2017	—	—	—	—	—	—	—	—	—	—	RMNZ: Gold	HOWSLA
"Would You Ever" (with Poo Bear)	2017	— (Note: "Would You Ever" did not enter the Billboard Hot 100, but peaked at number 24 on the Bubbling Under Hot 100 Singles chart.)	16	42	—	— (Note: "Would You Ever" did not enter the Ultratop 50, but peaked at number three on the Flemish Ultratip chart.)	61	—	— (Note: "Would You Ever" did not enter the NZ Top 40 Singles Chart, but peaked at number two on the NZ Heatseeker Singles Chart.)	91	55	RIAA: Gold; ARIA: 2× Platinum; MC: Gold; BPI: Silver; RMNZ: Platinum	Non-album singles
"Saint Laurent" (with DJ Sliink and Wale)	2017	—	—	—	—	—	—	—	—	—	—		Non-album singles
"Favor" (with Vindata and Nstasia)	2017	—	—	—	—	—	—	—	—	—	—		Non-album singles
"Humble (Skrillex remix)" (with Kendrick Lamar)	2017	—	—	—	—	—	—	—	—	—	—	ARIA: 14× Platinum	Non-album singles
"Goh" (with What So Not featuring KLP)	2018	—	—	—	—	—	—	—	—	—	—		Not All the Beautiful Things
"Agen Wida" (with Joyryde)	2018	—	35	—	—	—	—	—	—	—	—		Non-album single
"Face My Fears" (with Hikaru Utada)	2019	98	9	—	—	—	—	— (Note: "Face My Fears" did not enter the NZ Top 40 Singles Chart, but peaked at number 24 on the NZ Hot Singles Chart.)	—	—	—		Bad Mode
"Two Nights Part II" (Remix) (with Lykke Li and Ty Dolla Sign)	2019	—	—	—	—	—	—	—	—	—	—		Still Sad Still Sexy
"Midnight Hour" (with Boys Noize and Ty Dolla Sign)	2019	—	17	—	—	—	—	— (Note: "Midnight Hour" did not enter the NZ Top 40 Singles Chart, but peaked at number 37 on the NZ Hot Singles Chart.)	—	—	—		Non-album single
"Butterflies" (with Starrah and Four Tet)	2021	—	16	—	—	—	—	— (Note: "Butterflies" did not enter the NZ Top 40 Singles Chart, but peaked at number 26 on the NZ Hot Singles Chart.)	—	—	—		Quest for Fire
"Too Bizarre" (with Swae Lee and Siiickbrain)	2021	—	36	—	—	—	—	—	—	—	—		Quest for Fire
"Supersonic (My Existence)" (with Noisia, Josh Pan and Dylan Brady)	2021	—	13	—	—	—	—	— (Note: "Supersonic (My Existence)" did not enter the NZ Top 40 Singles Chart, but peaked at number 19 on the NZ Hot Singles Chart.)	—	—	—	RMNZ: Gold	Quest for Fire
"En Mi Cuarto" (with Jhay Cortez)	2021	—	8	—	—	—	—	—	—	—	—	RIAA: 2× Platinum (Latin)	Timelezz
"In da Getto" (with J Balvin)	2021	90	2	—	—	—	87	—	—	—	—		Jose
"Don't Go" (with Justin Bieber and Don Toliver)	2021	69	43	—	—	—	—	—	67	—	56		Don't Get Too Close
"Rumble" (with Fred Again and Flowdan)	2023	—	10	32	—	—	80	—	21	73	19	BPI: Silver; RMNZ: 2× Platinum	Quest for Fire
"Way Back" (with PinkPantheress and Trippie Redd)	2023	—	13	—	—	—	—	— (Note: "Way Back" did not enter the NZ Top 40 Singles Chart, but peaked at number nine on the NZ Hot Singles Chart.)	—	—	—		Don't Get Too Close
"Leave Me Like This" (with Bobby Raps)	2023	—	15	—	—	—	—	— (Note: "Leave Me Like This" did not enter the NZ Top 40 Singles Chart, but peaked at number 14 on the NZ Hot Singles Chart.)	—	—	—		Quest for Fire
"Real Spring" (with Bladee)	2023	—	20	—	—	—	—	—	—	—	—		Don't Get Too Close
"Xena" (with Nai Barghouti)	2023	—	21	—	—	—	—	—	—	—	—		Quest for Fire
"Don't Get Too Close" (with Bibi Bourelly)	2023	—	—	—	—	—	—	—	—	—	—		Don't Get Too Close
"Baby Again" (with Fred Again and Four Tet)	2023	—	11	70	—	—	—	—	—	—	52	BPI: Silver; RMNZ: Gold	USB
"Fine Day Anthem" (with Boys Noize and Opus III)	2023	—	21	—	—	—	—	—	— (Note: "Fine Day Anthem" did not enter the NZ Top 40 Singles Chart, but peaked at number 17 on the NZ Hot Singles Chart.)	—	—		Non-album single
"Badders" (with Peekaboo, Flowdan, and G-Rex)	2023	—	32	—	—	—	—	—	—	—	—		Eyes Wide Open
"Taka" (with Ahadadream and Priya Ragu)	2024	—	37	—	—	—	—	—	—	—	—		Non-album singles
"Push" (with Taichu, Hamdi, and Offaiah)	2024	—	27	—	—	—	—	—	— (Note: "Push" did not enter the NZ Top 40 Singles Chart, but peaked at number nine on the NZ Hot Singles Chart.)	—	—		Non-album singles
"Talk to Me" (with Champion and Four Tet featuring Naisha)	2024	—	49	—	—	—	—	—	—	—	—		Non-album singles
"Heavy Heart" (with Loco Dice and Fireboy DML)	2024	—	—	—	—	—	—	—	—	—	—		TBA
"La Noche" (with Chris Lake and Anita B Queen)	2025	—	15	—	—	—	—	—	— (Note: "La Noche" did not enter the NZ Top 40 Singles Chart, but peaked at number 19 on the NZ Hot Singles Chart.)	—	—		Non-album single
"Fuze" (with ISOxo)	2025	—	21	—	—	—	—	—	—	—	—		Hit Me Where It Hurts X
"Hit Me Where It Hurts" (with Dylan Brady and Caroline Polachek)	2025	—	—	—	—	—	—	—	—	—	—		Hit Me Where It Hurts X
"Duro" (with Young Miko)	2026	—	21	—	—	—	—	—	—	—	—		Soma
"Smoke" (with ISOxo, Cristale and TeeZandos)	2026	—	—	—	—	—	—	—	— (Note: "Smoke" did not enter the NZ Top 40 Singles Chart, but peaked at number 28 on the NZ Hot Singles Chart.)	—	—		Soma
"Thistle" (with Randomer, Blawan and MC Dricka)	2026	—	—	—	—	—	—	—	— (Note: "Thistle" did not enter the NZ Top 40 Singles Chart, but peaked at number 26 on the NZ Hot Singles Chart.)	—	—		Soma
"Rumpta" (with Solomun)	2026	—	—	—	—	—	—	—	— (Note: "Rumpta" did not enter the NZ Top 40 Singles Chart, but peaked at number 39 on the NZ Hot Singles Chart.)	—	—		Non-album single
"—" denotes a recording that did not chart or was released.

=== As featured artist ===
List of singles as featured artist, with selected chart positions and certifications, showing year released and album name
Title	Year	Peak chart positions								Certifications	Album
Title	Year	US	US R&B/ HH	US Rock	BEL (FL)	CAN	FRA	MEX	NZ	Certifications	Album
"Get Up!" (Korn featuring Skrillex)	2011	— (Note: "Get Up!" did not enter the Billboard Hot 100, but peaked at number eight on the Bubbling Under Hot 100 Singles chart.)	—	21	—	—	—	—	—	RIAA: Gold	The Path of Totality
"Narcissistic Cannibal" (Korn featuring Skrillex and Kill the Noise)	2011	— (Note: "Narcissistic Cannibal" did not enter the Billboard Hot 100, but peaked at number 17 on the Bubbling Under Hot 100 Singles chart.)	—	15	—	97	—	41	—		The Path of Totality
"Chaos Lives in Everything" (Korn featuring Skrillex)	2011	—	—	—	—	—	—	—	—		The Path of Totality
"Wild for the Night" (A$AP Rocky featuring Skrillex and Birdy Nam Nam)	2013	80	26	—	— (Note: "Wild for the Night" did not enter the Ultratop 50, but peaked at number 13 on the Flemish Ultratip chart.)	65	169	—	38	RIAA: Platinum; ARIA: Gold; MC: Platinum; RMNZ: 2× Platinum	Long. Live. ASAP
"Only Getting Younger" (Elliphant featuring Skrillex)	2014	—	—	—	—	—	—	—	—		Look Like You Love It
"Drum Machine" (Big Grams featuring Skrillex)	2015	—	—	—	—	—	—	—	—		Big Grams
"Spoon Me" (Elliphant featuring Skrillex)	2016	—	—	—	— (Note: "Spoon Me" did not enter the Ultratop 50, but registered on the Flemish Ultratip chart.)	—	—	—	—		Living Life Golden
"End of the World" (Mr. Oizo featuring Skrillex)	2016	—	—	—	—	—	—	—	—		All Wet
"So Am I" (Ty Dolla $ign featuring Damian Marley and Skrillex)	2017	—	—	—	—	—	—	—	— (Note: "So Am I" did not enter the NZ Top 40 Singles Chart, but peaked at number six on the NZ Heatseeker Singles Chart.)		Beach House 3
"Deadbeat" (Sirah featuring Skrillex)	2017	—	—	—	—	—	—	—	—		Non-album single
"Warlordz" (TroyBoi featuring Skrillex)	2019	—	—	—	—	—	—	—	—		Vibez, Vol. 3
"Way to Break My Heart" (Ed Sheeran featuring Skrillex)	2019	—	—	—	—	79	—	—	—		No. 6 Collaborations Project
"Ego Death" (Ty Dolla $ign featuring Kanye West, FKA Twigs and Skrillex)	2020	— (Note: "Ego Death" did not enter the Billboard Hot 100, but peaked at number seven on the Bubbling Under Hot 100 Singles chart.)	— (Note: "Ego Death" did not enter the Hot R&B/Hip-Hop Songs but peaked at number 17 on the R&B/Hip-Hop Digital Song Sales chart.)	—	—	—	—	—	—	RMNZ: Gold	Featuring Ty Dolla $ign
"Selection" (Lil Tecca featuring Skrillex and DJ Scheme)	2020	—	—	—	—	—	—	—	—		Virgo World
"Horizon" (Noisia featuring Skrillex)	2022	—	—	—	—	—	—	—	—		Closer
"Supersonic (VIP)" (Noisia featuring Josh Pan, Dylan Brady, Skrillex)	2022	—	—	—	—	—	—	—	—		Closer
"Torture Me" (100 gecs featuring Skrillex)	2022	—	—	—	—	—	—	—	—		Snake Eyes
"Essa Ta Quente" (Chase & Status featuring Skrillex)	2026	—	—	—	—	—	—	—	— (Note: "Essa Ta Quente" did not enter the NZ Top 40 Singles Chart, but peaked at number 24 on the NZ Hot 40 Singles Chart.)		Generic Everything
"—" denotes a recording that did not chart or was not released in that territory.

== Other charted songs ==
List of other charted songs, with selected chart positions and certifications, showing year released and album name
Title	Year	Peak chart positions						Certifications	Album
Title	Year	US	US Dance	AUS	CAN	NZ Hot	UK	Certifications	Album
"Rock 'n' Roll (Will Take You to the Mountain)"	2010	—	— (Note: "Rock 'n' Roll (Will Take You to the Mountain)" did not enter the Hot Dance/Electronic Songs chart, but peaked at number 32 on the Dance/Electronic Digital Song Sales chart.)	—	—	—	—	RIAA: Gold	Scary Monsters and Nice Sprites
"Kill Everybody"	2010	—	— (Note: "Kill Everybody" did not enter the Hot Dance/Electronic Songs chart, but peaked at number 21 on the Dance/Electronic Digital Song Sales chart.)	—	—	—	—	RIAA: Gold	Scary Monsters and Nice Sprites
"Still Getting It" (with Foreign Beggars)	2011	—	— (Note: "Still Getting It" did not enter Hot Dance/Electronic Songs chart, but peaked at number 18 on the Dance/Electronic Digital Song Sales chart.)	—	—	—	—		The Harder They Fall
"Ruffneck (Flex)"	2011	—	— (Note: "Ruffneck (Flex)" did not enter Hot Dance/Electronic Songs chart, but peaked at number 36 on the Dance/Electronic Digital Song Sales chart.)	—	—	—	—		More Monsters and Sprites
"Right In"	2011	—	24	—	—	—	—		Bangarang
"Kyoto" (featuring Sirah)	2011	74	— (Note: "Kyoto" did not enter Hot Dance/Electronic Songs chart, but peaked at number five on the Dance/Electronic Digital Song Sales chart.)	50	59	—	175	RIAA: Platinum; ARIA: Platinum; RMNZ: Gold	Bangarang
"The Devil's Den" (with Wolfgang Gartner)	2011	—	35	—	—	—	—		Bangarang
"Summit" (featuring Ellie Goulding)	2011	—	18	—	—	—	—	RIAA: Gold	Bangarang
"Reptile's Theme"	2011	—	— (Note: "Reptile's Theme" did not enter the Hot Dance/Electronic Songs chart, but peaked at number 27 on the Dance/Electronic Digital Song Sales chart.)	—	—	—	—		Mortal Kombat: Songs Inspired by the Warriors
"All Is Fair in Love and Brostep" (with Ragga Twins)	2014	—	17	—	—	—	—		Recess
"Stranger" (with KillaGraham, featuring Sam Dew)	2014	—	21	—	—	—	—		Recess
"Coast Is Clear" (with Chance the Rapper and The Social Experiment)	2014	—	33	—	—	—	—		Recess
"Doompy Poomp"	2014	—	45	—	—	—	—		Recess
"Fuck That"	2014	—	39	—	—	—	—		Recess
"Ease My Mind" (with Niki and the Dove)	2014	—	27	—	—	—	—		Recess
"Fire Away" (with Kid Harpoon)	2014	—	43	—	—	—	—		Recess
"Fuji Opener" (featuring Alvin Risk)	2019	—	36	—	—	—	—		Show Tracks
"Mumbai Power" (featuring Beam)	2019	—	41	—	—	—	—		Show Tracks
"Ratata" (with Missy Elliott and Mr. Oizo)	2023	—	8	—	—	6	—	RMNZ: Gold	Quest for Fire
"Tears" (with Joker and Sleepnet)	2023	—	20	—	—	25	—		Quest for Fire
"Inhale Exhale" (with Aluna and Kito)	2023	—	21	—	—	—	—		Quest for Fire
"A Street I Know" (with Eli Keszler)	2023	—	33	—	—	—	—		Quest for Fire
"Too Bizarre (Juked)" (with Swae Lee, Siiickbrain and Posij)	2023	—	36	—	—	—	—		Quest for Fire
"Hydrate" (with Flowdan, Beam and Peekaboo)	2023	—	26	—	—	26	—		Quest for Fire
"Good Space" (with Starrah)	2023	—	37	—	—	—	—		Quest for Fire
"Still Here (With the Ones That I Came With)" (with Porter Robinson and Bibi Bourelly)	2023	—	27	—	—	—	—		Quest for Fire
"Don't Leave Me Like This" (with Bobby Raps)	2023	—	48	—	—	—	—		Don't Get Too Close
"Selecta" (with Beam)	2023	—	39	—	—	—	—		Don't Get Too Close
"Ceremony" (with Yung Lean and Bladee)	2023	—	22	—	—	—	—		Don't Get Too Close
"Summertime" (with Kid Cudi)	2023	—	17	—	—	—	—		Don't Get Too Close
"Bad for Me" (with Corbin and Chief Keef)	2023	—	50	—	—	—	—		Don't Get Too Close
"Spitfire" (with Hawaii Slim)	2025	—	18	—	—	—	—		Fuck U Skrillex You Think Ur Andy Warhol but Ur Not!! <3
"While You Were Sleeping VIP" (with Virtual Riot and Naisha)	2025	—	25	—	—	—	—		Fuck U Skrillex You Think Ur Andy Warhol but Ur Not!! <3
"Recovery" (with Space Laces)	2025	—	21	—	—	—	—		Fuck U Skrillex You Think Ur Andy Warhol but Ur Not!! <3
"Andy"	2025	—	22	—	—	—	—		Fuck U Skrillex You Think Ur Andy Warhol but Ur Not!! <3
"Voltage"	2025	—	11	—	—	28	—		Fuck U Skrillex You Think Ur Andy Warhol but Ur Not!! <3
"Soma" (with Nitepunk)	2026	—	—	—	—	37	—		Soma
"Noche Without You" (with Feid)	2026	—	16	—	—	32	—		Soma
"—" denotes a recording that did not chart or was not released in that territory.

== Other appearances ==
List of non-single appearances, showing year released and album name
Year	Title	Album
2012	"Bug Hunt" (Noisia Remix)	Wreck-It Ralph soundtrack
2013	Rise and Shine Little Bitch (with Cliff Martinez)	Spring Breakers (Music From the Motion Picture)
2013	Bikinis & Big Booties Y'all (with Cliff Martinez)	Spring Breakers (Music From the Motion Picture)
2013	Smell This Money	Spring Breakers (Music From the Motion Picture)
2013	Park Smoke	Spring Breakers (Music From the Motion Picture)
2013	Ride Home	Spring Breakers (Music From the Motion Picture)
2013	Son of Scary Monsters (with Cliff Martinez)	Spring Breakers (Music From the Motion Picture)
2013	Scary Monsters on Strings	Spring Breakers (Music From the Motion Picture)
2023	"Vai Sentando" (with Ludmilla, King Doudou and Duki)	Fast X soundtrack
2024	"Glow" (with Fred Again, Duskus, Four Tet and Joy Anonymous)	Ten Days

=== Remixes ===
Year	Song	Artist
2008	"Go All the Way (Into the Twilight)"	Perry Farrell
2009	"No Mercy, Only Violence"	The Library
2009	"Shapeshift" (Horse the Band Vs. Skrillex)	Horse the Band
2009	"Golden Mummy Golden Bird" (Horse the Band vs. Skrillex)	Horse the Band
2009	"This Is the Shark Attack"	Shark Attack
2009	"Sensual Seduction"	Snoop Dogg
2009	"Sick Bubblegum"	Rob Zombie
2009	"Seventeen"	Casxio
2009	"The Sadness Will Never End"	Bring Me The Horizon
2009	"You Will Never Have It" (Swing Mix By Sonny)	Babyland
2009	"What Is Light? Where Is Laughter?"	Twin Atlantic
2009	"Bad Romance"	Lady Gaga
2010	"The Wind Blows"	The All-American Rejects
2010	"Alejandro"	Lady Gaga
2010	"Rock That Body"	The Black Eyed Peas
2010	"Scream And Shout"	Live Last
2010	"My Name Is Skrillex"	Skrillex
2010	"Woman" (Night Version)	The Secret Handshake
2010	"Domino" (Night Version)	The Secret Handshake
2010	"Stop!" (Night Version)	The Secret Handshake
2010	"In for the Kill"	La Roux
2010	"Hey Sexy Lady"	i SQUARE
2010	"Just the Way You Are" (Skrillex BatBoi Remix)	Bruno Mars
2010	"Zeig Mir Wie Du Tanzt"	Frida Gold
2011	"Cinema"	Benny Benassi (featuring Gary Go)
2011	"Love In Motion" (Skrillex's Funkt-Out Mix)	SebastiAn (featuring Mayer Hawthorne)
2011	"Promises" (with Nero)	Nero
2011	"Levels"	Avicii
2011	"Danger" (Released as "Syndicate")	Russell Shaw
2012	"Holdin' On" (with Nero)	MONSTA
2012	"Goin' In" ("Goin' Hard" Mix)	Birdy Nam Nam
2012	"Goin' In" ("Goin' Down" Mix)	Birdy Nam Nam
2013	"International"	Chase & Status
2014	"DJ, Ease My Mind" (Released as "Ease My Mind")	Niki & The Dove
2014	"NRG" (with Kill The Noise and Milo & Otis)	Duck Sauce
2014	"Burial" (with Trollphace)	Yogi (featuring Pusha T)
2014	"Ragga Bomb" (with Zomboy)	Skrillex (featuring Ragga Twins)
2015	"Bad Man"	Ragga Twins
2015	"Where Are Ü Now" (Marshmello Remix) [Skrillex Flip]	Jack Ü and Justin Bieber
2015	"Red Lips"	GTA (featuring Sam Bruno)
2015	"Stranger" (with Tennyson & White Sea)	Skrillex and Killagraham (featuring Sam Dew)
2016	"Make a Move"	Torro Torro
2016	"Red Lips" (Dillon Francis X Skrillex Rebirth)	GTA (featuring Sam Bruno)
2016	"Show Me Love" (featuring Chance The Rapper, Moses Sumney and Robin Hannibal)	Hundred Waters
2017	"Humble"	Kendrick Lamar
2017	"Babylon" (with Ronny J)	Ekali (featuring Denzel Curry)
2018	"The Island, Part 1"	Pendulum
2018	"Sicko Mode"	Travis Scott
2019	"Due West"	Kelsey Lu
2021	"Supersonic" (with Noisia, released as "Supersonic (My Existence)")	josh pan and Dylan Brady
2023	"Face My Fears" (with Virtual Riot)	Hikaru Utada & Skrillex

== Music videos ==
=== As lead artist ===
List of music videos as lead artist, showing year released and directors
Title	Year	Director(s)
"Mora" (Demo) (as Sonny)	2009	Sonny & The Blood Monkeys
"Mora" (as Sonny)	2009	Shawn Butcher
"Rock 'n' Roll (Will Take You to the Mountain)"	2011	Jason Ano
"First of the Year (Equinox)"	2011	Tony Truand
"Ruffneck (Full Flex)"	2011	Tony Truand
"Bangarang" (featuring Sirah)	2012	Tony Truand
"Lick It" (with Kaskade)	2012	Sean Stiegemeier
"Make It Bun Dem" (with Damian "Jr. Gong" Marley)	2012	Tony Truand
"The Devil's Den" (with Wolfgang Gartner)	2012	Arev Manoukian
"Breakn' a Sweat" (with The Doors)	2012	Radical Friend
"Summit" (featuring Ellie Goulding)	2013	Pilerats
"Try It Out" (Neon Mix) (with Alvin Risk)	2013	Sonny Moore and Marcio Alvarado
"Ragga Bomb" (featuring Ragga Twins)	2014	Terrence Neale
"Try It Out" (Neon Mix) (with Alvin Risk)	2014	Tony Truand
"Fuck That"	2014	Nabil Elderkin
"Dirty Vibe" (with Diplo featuring G-Dragon and CL)	2014	Lil' Internet
"Doompy Poomp"	2015	Fleur & Manu
"Burial" (with Yogi featuring Pusha T, Moody Good and TrollPhace)	2015	Grant Singer
"Ease My Mind" (with Niki and the Dove)	2015	ROBOTO
"Bun Up the Dance" (with Dillon Francis)	2015	David M. Helman
"Working for It" (with Zhu and THEY.)	2015	Birdy Ben
"Stranger" (Skrillex Remix with Tennyson & White Sea) (with KillaGraham)	2015	Andrew Donoho
"Red Lips (Skrillex Remix)" (by GTA)	2016	Grant Singer
"Squad Out!" (with Jauz featuring Fatman Scoop)	2016	Lilfuchs
"Killa" (with Wiwek featuring Elliphant)	2016	Jodeb
"No Chill" (with Vic Mensa)	2016	Colin Tilley
"Purple Lamborghini" (with Rick Ross)	2016	Colin Tilley
"Waiting" (with RL Grime and What So Not)	2016	Uncredited
"Would You Ever" (with Poo Bear)	2017	Skrillex
"Face My Fears" (with Hikaru Utada)	2019	Liam Underwood
"Too Bizarre" (with Swae Lee and Siiickbrain)	2021	Jodeb
"Butterflies" (with Starrah and Four Tet)	2021	Ben Strebel
"En Mi Cuarto" (with Jhay Cortez)	2021	Stillz
"In da Getto" (with J Balvin)	2021	Alfred Marroquín
"Don't Go" (with Justin Bieber and Don Toliver)	2021	Salomon Ligthelm
"Real Spring" (with Bladee)	2023	Gus Reichwald
"Ceremony" (with Yung Lean and Bladee)	2023	Gus Reichwald
"Rumble" (with Fred Again and Flowdan)	2023	Manu Cossu
"Xena" (with Nai Barghouti)	2023	Amara Abbas

=== As featured artist ===
List of music videos as featured artist, showing year released and directors
Title	Year	Director(s)
"Cinema (Skrillex Remix)" (Benny Benassi featuring Gary Go)	2011	Lenny Beckerman
"Get Up!" (Korn featuring Skrillex)	2011	Sébastian Paquet and Joshua Allen
"Narcissistic Cannibal" (Korn featuring Skrillex and Kill the Noise)	2011	Alex Bulkley
"Chaos Lives in Everything" (Korn featuring Skrillex)	2012	Joshua Allen
"Still Getting It" (Foreign Beggars featuring Skrillex)	2012	Jason Ano
"Goin' in (Skrillex "Goin Hard" Mix)" (Birdy Nam Nam)	2012	Tony Truand
"Wild for the Night" (A$AP Rocky featuring Skrillex and Birdy Nam Nam)	2013	Chris Robinson, ASAP Rocky
"Only Getting Younger" (Elliphant featuring Skrillex)	2014	Jordon Bahat
"Show Me Love" (Skrillex Remix) (Hundred Waters featuring Chance the Rapper, Moses Sumney and Robin Hannibal)	2016	Skrillex, Frank Mobilio (photography)
"Drum Machine" (Big Grams featuring Skrillex)	2016	Bryan Barber
"Spoon Me" (Elliphant featuring Skrillex)	2016	Aisha Linnea & Shahbaz Shigri
"Deadbeat" (Sirah featuring Skrillex)	2017	David Forehand
"Ego Death" (Ty Dolla $ign featuring Kanye West, FKA Twigs and Skrillex)	2020	Emonee LaRussa
"Torture Me" (100 gecs featuring Skrillex)	2022	Laura Les and Dylan Brady

=== With Dog Blood ===
List of music videos, showing year released and directors
Title	Year	Director(s)
"Next Order"	2012	Sil van der Woerd
"Chella Ride"	2013	Golden Wolf

=== With Jack Ü ===
List of music videos, showing year released and directors
Title	Year	Director(s)
"Take Ü There" (featuring Kiesza)	2014	Kyle dePinna, Dillon Moore, & Daniel Streit
"Where Are Ü Now" (with Justin Bieber)	2015	Brewer
"To Ü" (featuring AlunaGeorge)	2015	AG Rojas
"Beats Knockin" (featuring Fly Boi Keno)	2015	Edward John Drake
"Mind" (featuring Kai)	2016	Liam Underwood

=== With From First to Last (as Sonny Moore) ===
Year	Title	Director
2004	"Ride the Wings of Pestilence"	Pax Franchot
2005	"Note to Self"	Pax Franchot
2006	"The Latest Plague"	Popcore Film
2006	"Shame Shame"	

== With Dog Blood ==
=== Extended plays ===
Title	Details	Track listing
Next Order / Middle Finger	Released: August 12, 2012; Label: Owsla/Boysnoize Records; Formats: Digital download, vinyl	"Next Order"; "Middle Finger"
Middle Finger Pt. 2	Released: September 16, 2013; Label: OWSLA/Boysnoize Records; Formats: Digital download, vinyl	"Middle Finger Pt. 2"; "Chella Ride"; "Shred or Die"; "Middle Finger (The M Machine Remix)"; "Middle Finger Pt. 2 (Millions Like Us Remix)"; "Chella Ride (Mr. Oizo Remix)" (Note: Exclusive track from limited edition red vinyl in which "Middle Finger Pt. 2 (Millions Like Us Remix)" is omitted)
Turn Off the Lights	Released: May 31, 2019; Label: OWSLA / Boysnoize Records; Formats: Digital download, streaming	"Break Law"; "4 Mind" (with Josh Pan and X&G); "Kokoe" (with Otira); "Turn Off the Lights"

=== Singles ===
Year	Title	Label
2019	"Turn Off the Lights"	Owsla / Boysnoize Records / Atlantic Records
2019	"Midnight Hour" (featuring Ty Dolla $ign)	Owsla / Atlantic Records
2023	"Fine Day Anthem"	Owsla / Boysnoize Records / Atlantic Records

=== Remixes ===
Year	Title	Artist	Label
2013	"Wild for the Night" (featuring Skrillex and Birdy Nam Nam)	A$AP Rocky	Owsla / Nest
2013	"Higher State of Consciousness" (Dog Blood Edit)	Josh Wink	N/A (Unreleased)
2014	"Midnight"	Boys Noize	N/A (Unreleased)
2019	"4 MIND" (featuring josh pan and X&G) - Good Times Ahead remix	Dog Blood	Owsla / Boysnoize Records / Atlantic Records

== With Jack Ü ==
=== Studio albums ===
List of studio albums, with selected chart positions and certifications
Title	Album details	Peak chart positions						Certifications
Title	Album details	US	US Dance/ Elec.	AUS	CAN	NZ	UK	Certifications
Jack Ü	Released: February 27, 2015; Label: Atlantic, Mad Decent, Owsla; Formats: CD, digital download, Vinyl	26	1	12	23	15	131	RIAA: Platinum; MC: Platinum; RMNZ: Gold

=== Singles ===
List of singles, with selected chart positions and certifications, showing year released and album name
Title	Year	Peak chart positions										Certifications	Album
Title	Year	US	US Dance Club	US Dance/ Elec.	AUS	CAN	NOR	NZ	SWE	UK	UK Dance	Certifications	Album
"Take Ü There" (featuring Kiesza)	2014	—	37	14	—	—	—	—	—	63	16	RIAA: Platinum	Skrillex and Diplo Present Jack Ü
"Where Are Ü Now" (with Justin Bieber)	2015	8	32	1	3	5	12	3	6	3	1	RIAA: 6× Platinum; ARIA: 6× Platinum; BPI: 2× Platinum; GLF: Platinum; IFPI NOR: 2× Platinum; MC: 7× Platinum; RMNZ: 4× Platinum	Skrillex and Diplo Present Jack Ü
"To Ü" (featuring AlunaGeorge)	2015	—	—	28	83	—	—	—	—	—	—	RIAA: Gold; ARIA: Gold; RMNZ: Platinum	Skrillex and Diplo Present Jack Ü
"—" denotes a recording that did not chart or was not released in that territory.

=== Other charted songs ===
List of other charted songs, with selected chart positions and certifications, showing year released and album name
Title	Year	Peak chart positions	Certifications	Album
Title	Year	US Dance/ Elec.	Certifications	Album
"Beats Knockin" (featuring Fly Boi Keno)	2015	35		Skrillex and Diplo Present Jack Ü
"Febreze" (featuring 2 Chainz)	2015	27		Skrillex and Diplo Present Jack Ü
"Jungle Bae" (featuring Bunji Garlin)	2015	37		Skrillex and Diplo Present Jack Ü
"Mind" (featuring Kai)	2015	24	RIAA: Gold; RMNZ: Gold	Skrillex and Diplo Present Jack Ü

=== Remixes ===
Title	Year	Artist(s)	Album
"7/11"	2014	Beyoncé	Non-album single

=== Production credits ===
Title	Year	Artist(s)	Album
"16"	2016	Craig David	Following My Intuition
"Get It Right"	2018	Diplo (featuring MØ)	Give Me Future
"Light Me Up"	2018	RL Grime (featuring Julia Michaels & Miguel)	Nova

== With From First to Last (as Sonny Moore) ==
=== Studio albums ===
Year	Album details	Peak chart positions					
Year	Album details	US	US Heat.	US Ind.	AUS	CAN	UK
2004	Dear Diary, My Teen Angst Has a Bodycount: Released: June 28, 2004; Label: Epitaph; Format: CD	—	12	21	—	—	—
2006	Heroine: Released: March 21, 2006; Label: Epitaph; Format: CD	25	—	2	71	38	192

=== Singles ===
Year	Title	Album
2004	"Populace In Two"	Dear Diary, My Teen Angst Has a Body Count
2004	"Ride the Wings of Pestilence"	Dear Diary, My Teen Angst Has a Body Count
2005	"Note to Self"	Dear Diary, My Teen Angst Has a Body Count
2006	"The Latest Plague"	Heroine
2006	"Shame Shame"	Heroine
2017	"Make War"	Non-album singles
2018	"Surrender"	Non-album singles

=== Compilation appearances ===
Year	Title	Album
2005	"Failure by Designer Jeans"	Punk-O-Rama 10
2005	"Christmassacre"	Taste of Christmas
2006	"The Latest Plague" (Atticus remix)	Unsound

== Production credits ==
Title	Year	Artist(s)	Album
"You Were The King, Now You're Unconscious"	2009	Atreyu	Congregation of the Damned
"All I Wanna Do"	2010	Methods Of Mayhem	A Public Disservice Announcement
"Catch Me" (featuring Alec Empire)	2011	Mustard Pimp	No Title Or Purpose
"Bring Out The Devil"	2011	SOFI	Locked & Loaded: Part 2
"Bittersweet"	2012	Ellie Goulding	The Twilight Saga: Breaking Dawn – Part 2 (Original Motion Picture Soundtrack)
"I'll Show You"	2015	Justin Bieber	Purpose
"Sorry"	2015	Justin Bieber	Purpose
"The Feeling" (featuring Halsey)	2015	Justin Bieber	Purpose
"Children"	2015	Justin Bieber	Purpose
"Hit The Ground"	2015	Justin Bieber	Purpose
"Go Off"	2016	M.I.A	AIM
"Talk"	2016	M.I.A	AIM
"16"	2016	Craig David	Following My Intuition
"Hate"	2016	4Minute	Act. 7
"Top of the World"	2017	Kimbra	Primal Heart
"No Fun"	2017	Incubus	8
"Nimble Bastard"	2017	Incubus	8
"State of the Art"	2017	Incubus	8
"Glitterbomb"	2017	Incubus	8
"Undefeated"	2017	Incubus	8
"Loneliest"	2017	Incubus	8
"When I Became a Man"	2017	Incubus	8
"Familiar Faces"	2017	Incubus	8
"Love in a Time of Surveillance"	2017	Incubus	8
"Make No Sound in the Digital Forest"	2017	Incubus	8
"Throw Out the Map"	2017	Incubus	8
"Angel"	2017	Fifth Harmony	Fifth Harmony
"Get It Right" (featuring MØ)	2018	Diplo	Major Lazer Presents: Give Me Future (Music From & Inspired by the Film)
"She Loves Control"	2018	Camila Cabello	Camila
"Wasted Times"	2018	The Weeknd	My Dear Melancholy
"Perdido" (featuring J Balvin)	2018	Poo Bear	Poo Bear Presents Bearthday Music
"All We Can Do" (featuring Juanes)	2018	Poo Bear	Poo Bear Presents Bearthday Music
"Light Me Up" (featuring Julia Michaels & Miguel)	2018	RL Grime	Nova
"Complicated" (featuring Nao)	2018	Mura Masa	Non-album single
"Arms Around You" (featuring Maluma and Swae Lee)	2018	XXXTentacion and Lil Pump	Non-album single
"The Distance" (featuring Ty Dolla $ign)	2018	Mariah Carey	Caution
"Chemicals"	2018	Key	Face
"Take Me Back to London" (featuring Stormzy)	2019	Ed Sheeran	No. 6 Collaborations Project
"OMW"	2019	Zac Brown	The Owl
"Holy Terrain" (featuring Future)	2019	FKA Twigs	Magdalene
"Plastic Doll"	2020	Lady Gaga	Chromatica
"Man of the Year"	2020	Juice Wrld	Legends Never Die
"Homesick"	2020	DJ Scheme, Zacari	Family
"Somebody"	2021	Justin Bieber	Justice
"The Day You Left"	2021	Poo Bear	Non-album single
"Waiting to Feel Like This"	2021	Louis the Child	Euphoria
"Where You Are"	2022	PinkPantheress featuring Willow	Non-album single
"Energy"	2022	Beyoncé	Renaissance
"Beep"	2022	M.I.A.	Mata
"Ignite the Love"	2022	Kid Cudi	Entergalactic
"So Then"	2026	Naisha featuring Ty Dolla Sign	911
