= Saint Laurent (song) =

Single by DJ Sliink, Skrillex and Wale
- Released: August 3, 2017
- Genre: Hip hop; EDM
- Length: 2:32
- Label: Owsla

Skrillex singles chronology
"Would You Ever" (2017)	"Saint Laurent" (2017)	"Favor" (2017)

Wale singles chronology
"Fashion Week" (2017)	"Saint Laurent" (2017)	"Spirit" (2017)

"Saint Laurent" is a song by producers DJ Sliink and Skrillex, and rapper Wale. It was released on August 3, 2017, via Owsla.

== Background ==
The song was described as a high-energy club-ready banger by XXL. It was released on Skrillex's Owsla label. The cover art, which is minimal and dark, was revealed on Reddit. Skrillex was quoted talking about the collaboration:

DJ Sliink’s sound is one of the most influential styles in mainstream music and most people don’t know it. I’m just honored to be a part of his original vision and help him with the beat. And props to Wale for showing love to the underground and fuckn’ with Jersey Club.
