= My Name Is Skrillex =

EP by Skrillex
- Released: June 7, 2010
- Recorded: May 4, 2010
- Genres: Dubstep; electro house
- Length: 28:34
- Label: Self-released
- Producer: Skrillex

Skrillex chronology
Gypsyhook EP (2009)	My Name Is Skrillex (2010)	Scary Monsters and Nice Sprites (2010)

Singles from My Name is Skrillex
- 1. "Weekends!!!" Released: October 25, 2010

My Name Is Skrillex is the debut EP by American electronic music producer Skrillex. The EP was self-released for free on Skrillex's Myspace page on June 7, 2010. The link can now be found on his Facebook page. It is also available for free download on SoundCloud. It is Moore's first release to feature the stage name Skrillex.

== Track listing ==
No.	Title	Length
1.	"My Name Is Skrillex"	4:31
2.	"Weekends!!!" (featuring Sirah)	4:45
3.	"Fucking Die 1"	3:50
4.	"Fucking Die 2 (€€ Cooper Mix)"	5:37
5.	"Do Da Oliphant"	3:27
6.	"With You, Friends"	6:22
Total length:		28:34

Bonus track
No.	Title	Length
7.	"My Name Is Skrillex" (Skrillex Remix)	4:46

== Reception ==
In a 2018 review of the EP, Kat Bein of Billboard called the My Name Is Skrillex a "timeless classic", and said it "plays like a perfect specimen of its time and a mind-blowing map of the future it set in motion". Matthew Meadow of Your EDM named the EP "one of [dance] culture’s most important". Nick Yopko of EDM.com called the EP "one of the most influential EDM albums of all time".
