= Rumble (Skrillex, Fred Again and Flowdan song) =

2023 single by Skrillex, Fred Again and Flowdan

Single by Skrillex, Fred again.. and Flowdan

from the album Quest for Fire & USB
- Released: January 4, 2023
- Genre: Dubstep; grime
- Length: 2:26
- Label: Atlantic; Owsla
- Songwriters: Sonny Moore; Fred Gibson; Marc Veira; Elley Duhé; Jordan Douglas; Tyshane Thompson
- Producers: Skrillex; Fred again..

Skrillex singles chronology
"Torture Me" (2022)	"Rumble" (2023)	"Way Back" (2023)

Fred again.. singles chronology
"Strong" (2022)	"Rumble" (2023)	"Baby Again…" (2023)

Flowdan singles chronology
"Run the Show" (2022)	"Rumble" (2023)	"Stone" (2023)

Music video
- "Rumble" on YouTube

"Rumble" is a song by American record producer Skrillex, British record producer Fred Again, and British rapper Flowdan. It was released as a single through Atlantic Records and Owsla on January 4, 2023, with production handled by Skrillex and Fred Again. The song also features uncredited vocals from American singer Elley Duhé, sampled from unfinished works from Fred Again and Skrillex, and Jamaican-American rapper Beam, sampled from Skrillex's track "Selecta". It is the first single from Skrillex's second studio album Quest for Fire, his first since 2014's Recess.

== Background ==
In an interview with BBC Radio 1, Skrillex explained that "Rumble" was initially a collaboration between Fred Again and Flowdan from 2018. After meeting Fred and hearing the song for the first time, he asked for the song's stems and made his own version, which he disliked: "I did something. I didn't like it. I thought I ruined the song. I was scared to play it and then we started working on it like months ago." English producer Four Tet was also involved, but eventually was "kicked off" the track. During a live set at the Electric Ballroom in London on January 6, 2023, featuring all three producers, Skrillex explained that Four Tet's role "was the most important role, which was to make sure we didn't overproduce it and spoil it".

== Composition ==
"Rumble" has been described as containing elements from grime, dubstep, jungle, and experimental electronic music.

== Release and promotion ==
In July 2022, Fred Again played a set for Boiler Room in London, in which the song was included and played in public for the first time. The song became a fan-favourite from the set, creating excitement for a possible release and prompting unofficial uploads of the song to appear on YouTube in the weeks leading up to release.

On January 2, 2023, Skrillex posted a 15-second teaser of Rumble on social media, alongside the text "QFF/DGTC 23", announcing his two albums Quest for Fire and Don't Get Too Close, the former being his first studio album in nine years, following 2014's Recess. The announcement of the albums and song's release garnered positive reaction, including from fellow producers Tchami, Subtronics, Kill the Noise, Eptic, Deorro, and rapper Missy Elliott, among others.

The song was released on January 4, 2023. The next day, a live set with Skrillex, Fred Again, and Four Tet took place at the Electric Ballroom in London, where Rumble was played. It was subsequently released on Skrillex's Quest for Fire as well as Fred Again's USB compilation album (hence the cover depicting the character from the cover of the former over the original USB cover).

== Critical reception ==
Upon release, the song received positive reviews from fans and critics. Jon Blistein of Rolling Stone wrote "Rumble lives up to its name, with Flowdan rapping over a steady, propulsive groove punctuated with menacing bass swells. The two-and-half-minute track builds steadily to a clever peak that drops with a deft, almost understated boom." Cameron Sunkel of EDM.com stated that Rumble "appropriately combines the best of [Skrillex and Fred Again's] respective worlds in flawless fashion", adding that "Skrillex's mission to make the club shake remains undeterred", and that "the spirit of the duo's collective penchant for deep dubstep and jungle-inspired electronic music shines through in spades." Katie Bain of Billboard wrote that despite its short length, "the song packs a heavy punch with a sinewy, stuttering beat simmered in the deepest vibrations of the low end and a bridge composed of a voice pitched all the way up", while also praising Flowdan's delivery and lyrical content.

== Charts ==
=== Weekly charts ===
Weekly chart performance for "Rumble"
Chart (2023)	Peak position
Australia (ARIA)	32
Canada Hot 100 (Billboard)	80
Global 200 (Billboard)	169
Ireland (IRMA)	29
Japan Hot Overseas (Billboard Japan)	16
Latvia (LAIPA)	15
Lithuania (AGATA)	66
Netherlands (Single Tip)	9
New Zealand (Recorded Music NZ)	21
Sweden (Sverigetopplistan)	73
UK Singles (Official Charts)	19
UK Dance (Official Charts)	6
US Hot Dance/Electronic Songs (Billboard)	10

=== Year-end charts ===
Year-end chart performance for "Rumble"
Chart (2023)	Position
US Hot Dance/Electronic Songs (Billboard)	35

== Certifications ==
Certifications for "Rumble"
Region	Certification	Certified units/sales
Canada (Music Canada)	Platinum	80,000^{‡}
New Zealand (RMNZ)	2× Platinum	60,000^{‡}
United Kingdom (BPI)	Silver	200,000^{‡}
^{‡} Sales+streaming figures based on certification alone.

== Release history ==
Release dates and formats for "Rumble"
Country	Date	Format	Label	Ref.
Various	January 4, 2023	Digital download; streaming	Atlantic; Owsla	
