= En Mi Cuarto =

2021 single by Jhayco and Skrillex

Single by Jhayco and Skrillex

from the album Timelezz
- Language: Spanish
- Released: July 30, 2021
- Length: 3:16
- Label: Universal Latino
- Songwriter(s): Jhayco; Skrillex; Tainy
- Producer(s): Jhayco; Skrillex; Tainy

Jhayco singles chronology
"911 (remix)" (2021)	"En Mi Cuarto" (2021)	"Delincuente" (2021)

Skrillex singles chronology
"In da Getto" (2021)	"En Mi Cuarto" (2021)	"Don't Go" (2021)

Music video
- "En Mi Cuarto" on YouTube

"En Mi Cuarto" (transl. "In My Room") is a song by Puerto Rican rapper Jhayco and American record producer Skrillex. It was released as a single on July 30, 2021. The song was written and produced by Jhayco, Skrillex and Tainy. It is from his second album, Timelezz.

== Composition ==
The song is written in the key of G♭ Minor, with a tempo of 115 beats per minute.

== Critical reception ==
Ariel King of Dancing Astronaut commented the song has "smooth beat matches Cortez’s crisp vocal flow, creating a slinking track that’s fit for packed nightclubs." Ellie Mullins of We Rave You thought it "is a perfect anthem for the late summer nights or for a tropical DJ set with the sunset as the background."

== Music video ==
An accompanying music video was released on July 30, 2021, directed by Stillz, and starring Mia Khalifa. The characteristic of video is "thrilling shots of Cortez on a motorcycle and partying in the back of a fast-moving truck." and ends with "Skrillex and Cortez party in a room that bursts into flames."

== Credits and personnel ==
Credits adapted from AllMusic.

- Jhayco – composer, primary artist, voices
- Skrillex – composer, primary artist, producer, voices
- Tainy – composer, producer

== Charts ==
=== Weekly charts ===
Weekly chart performance for "En Mi Cuarto"
Chart (2021)	Peak position
Spain (PROMUSICAE)	31
US Hot Dance/Electronic Songs (Billboard)	8
US Hot Latin Songs (Billboard)	22

=== Year-end charts ===
Year-end chart performance for "En Mi Cuarto"
Chart (2021)	Position
US Hot Dance/Electronic Songs (Billboard)	38

== Certifications ==
Certifications for "En Mi Cuarto"
Region	Certification	Certified units/sales
Spain (PROMUSICAE)	Platinum	60,000^{‡}
United States (RIAA)	2× Platinum (Latin)	120,000^{‡}
^{‡} Sales+streaming figures based on certification alone.
