= Fuck U Skrillex You Think Ur Andy Warhol but Ur Not!! =

Fuck U Skrillex You Think Ur Andy Warhol but Ur Not!! <3

Studio album by Skrillex
- Released: April 1, 2025
- Recorded: 2010–2025
- Genres: Dubstep; brostep; complextro; house; drum and bass; EDM trap; UK garage
- Length: 46:27
- Labels: Owsla; Atlantic
- Producers: Skrillex; Boys Noize; Dylan Brady; Car!ton; Dilip; Eurohead; John Feldmann; Fred Again; G Jones; Heavy Mellow; Ilykimchi; Isoxo; Jamesjamesjames; Peter Lee Johnson; Joker; Jónsi; Rex Kudo; Parisi; Space Laces; Sleepnet; Team EZY; Whitearmor; Wuki; Varg^{2TM}; Virtual Riot

Skrillex chronology
Don't Get Too Close (2023)	Fuck U Skrillex You Think Ur Andy Warhol but Ur Not!! <3 (2025)	Hit Me Where It Hurts X (2025)

Skrillex studio album chronology
Don't Get Too Close (2023)	Fuck U Skrillex You Think Ur Andy Warhol but Ur Not!! <3 (2025)	Soma (2026)

Fuck U Skrillex You Think Ur Andy Warhol but Ur Not!! <3 (stylized in all caps, and more commonly shortened to Fuck U Skrillex or FUS) is the fourth studio album by American record producer Skrillex. It was released on April 1, 2025, through Atlantic Records and Owsla as a surprise album. Unlike his previous three albums, it is presented as a continuous mix hosted by producer DJ Smokey. Stylistically, the album has been described as a return to Skrillex's dubstep roots, featuring several previously unreleased tracks dating back to 2010.

The album features appearances from a wide variety of collaborators, including Boys Noize, Dylan Brady, Varg²™, Whitearmor, Starrah, Zacari, Virtual Riot and Parisi. Production was primarily handled by Skrillex himself, alongside Fred Again, Varg²™, Whitearmor, and Eurohead, among others. Fuck U Skrillex follows his pair of 2023 albums, Quest for Fire and Don't Get Too Close. The album received a nomination for Best Dance/Electronic Album at the 68th Grammy Awards.

== Release ==
Fuck U Skrillex received no previous promotion, and was released as a surprise album. On March 31, 2025, one night before release, the full mixtape was shared by Skrillex via a Dropbox link sent to his email subscriber list. The album was released to streaming services on April 1, 2025. The cover photograph was taken near the NestHQ media company building in Los Angeles, California and features a first generation Mazda Miata.

Several months prior up to the album's release, Skrillex made public comments on his Twitter/X account about his frustration with Atlantic Records. Since his contract required four albums, this album is to be Skrillex's final project with Atlantic, which has been affiliated with every Skrillex release since his debut single "Weekends!!!" (2010).

== Critical reception ==
Professional ratings
Aggregate scores
Source	Rating
Metacritic	74/100
Review scores
Source	Rating
AllMusic	3/5 stars
NME	3/5 stars
Pitchfork	8.0/10
Rolling Stone	3.5/5 stars
Tom Hull	B−

According to the review aggregator Metacritic, Fuck U Skrillex You Think Ur Andy Warhol but Ur Not!! received "generally favorable reviews" based on a weighted average score of 74 out of 100 from 5 critic scores.

In a review for Billboard, Katie Bain called the album "occasionally laugh-out-loud funny" and "ultimately quite moving", noting its "tongue-in-cheek" tone and praising "Voltage" as "one of the most, if not the most, emotionally resonant, truly moving songs of the entire Skrillex catalog".

A positive review by Michaelangelo Matos for Rolling Stone noted the album's "playful edge" and attention to detail. Receiving the album positively, Vulture's Craig Jenkins praised the album's eclecticism, likening the album's mixtape format to Resident Advisor mixes and DJ Drama's Gangsta Grillz series.

== Track listing ==
Fuck U Skrillex You Think Ur Andy Warhol but Ur Not!! <3 track listing
No.	Title	Writer(s)	Producer(s)	Length
1.	"Skrillex Is Dead" (with DJ Smokey)	Sonny Moore; Everett Romano; Peter Lee Johnson; Rex Kudo	Skrillex; Heavy Mellow; Johnson; Kudo	0:51
2.	"Spitfire" (with Hawaii Slim)	Moore; Keith Hall	Skrillex	1:29
3.	"While You Were Sleeping VIP" (with Virtual Riot and Naisha)	Moore; Valentin Brunn; Naisha Barghabi	Skrillex; Virtual Riot	0:57
4.	"Slickman"	Moore; Barghabi	Skrillex	0:44
5.	"Tears Lost Drop" (with Joker and Sleepnet)	Moore; Liam McLean; Nik Roos; Fred Jerkins III; Isaac Phillips; Rodney Jerkins	Skrillex; Joker; Sleepnet	1:16
6.	"Things I Promised"	Moore	Skrillex; Virtual Riot	0:57
7.	"Recovery" (with Space Laces)	Moore; Ian Slider	Skrillex; Space Laces	1:10
8.	"Andy" (Removed from streaming platforms)	Moore; Kudo; Phillips; Dylan Wiggins; Carlton McDowell, Jr.; Badriia Bourelly; Beyoncé Knowles; Brandy Norwood; Brittany Coney; Denisia Andrews; Joe Zarrillo; Khaled Khaled; Nayvadius Wilburn; Paris Davis; R. Jerkins; Sean Bryant; Shawn Carter	Skrillex; Kudo; Wiggins; Car!ton; Nik Roos; Isoxo	1:52
9.	"Squishy Clip"	Moore	Skrillex	0:47
10.	"Look at You" (with Jónsi)	Moore; Jón Þor Birgisson	Skrillex; Jónsi	0:51
11.	"Gulab XX" (with Naisha)	Moore; Barghabi	Skrillex; Isoxo	1:19
12.	"Momentum" (with Zacari and Starrah, featuring Ilykimchi)	Moore; Zacari Pacaldo; Brittany Hazzard; Nelida Yew	Skrillex; Isoxo; Ilykimchi	1:18
13.	"Animals Beat" (with Team EZY)	Moore; Drew Gold; Njomza Vitia	Skrillex; Team EZY	0:29
14.	"Mirchi Test" (with Virtual Riot and Naisha)	Moore; Brunn; Barghabi	Skrillex; Virtual Riot; Isoxo	1:06
15.	"Hold On"	Moore; Nahshid Sulaiman	Skrillex; Isoxo	0:32
16.	"See You Again VIP" (with Swedm (Note: Swedm is Varg²™ and Eurohead.) and Loam)	Moore; Brunn; Simon Hessman; Jonas Rönnberg	Skrillex; Varg²™; Eurohead; Virtual Riot	1:16
17.	"Morja Kaiju VIP"	Moore; Sulaiman; Alvin Risk	Skrillex; Roos^{[v]}	1:29
18.	"Korabu" (with Bgirl and Parisi, featuring Eurohead, Varg²™, Whitearmor, and Jamesjamesjames)	Moore; Hessman; Rönnenberg; Marco Parisi; Giampaolo Parisi; Fred Gibson; Ludwig Rosenberg; Jamesjamesjames	Skrillex; Parisi; Varg2TM; Fred Again; Whitearmor; Jamesjamesjames^{[a]}	2:01
19.	"Redline Dash"	Moore; Barghabi; Hessman; Gold; Rönnenberg; Jordan Douglas; Tyshane Thomas; Dilip Venkatesh	Skrillex; Varg2TM; Eurohead; Dilip; Team EZY	1:16
20.	"Zeet Noise" (with Boys Noize and Dylan Brady)	Moore; Dylan Brady; Alex Ridha	Skrillex; Boys Noize; Brady	2:14
21.	"Booster" (with Dylan Brady)	Moore; Brady	Skrillex; Brady	1:52
22.	"Fricky VIP"	Moore	Skrillex	0:38
23.	"Ultra Intro" (with LH4L)	Moore; Steve Aoki; Clay Broussard; Kévin Ureta; Simone Cogo; Sophia Broussard	Skrillex	1:03
24.	"Jungundra"	Moore; F. Jerkins; R. Jerkins; Phillips; LaShawn Daniels; Nycolia Turman	Skrillex	1:29
25.	"Druids" (with G Jones)	Moore; Alison Wonderland; Gregory Jones	Skrillex; G Jones; Isoxo	1:39
26.	"Biggy Bap" (with Wuki and DJ Smokey)	Moore; Kris Varman; JaVocca Davis	Skrillex; Wuki	2:55
27.	"Say Goodbye" (with Njomza and Eurohead featuring Team EZY, Varg²™ and Swedm)	Moore; Vitia; Rönnberg; Hessman; Gold	Skrillex; Varg²™; Team EZY; Eurohead	1:48
28.	"Mosquitotouille"	Moore	Skrillex; Isoxo	0:38
29.	"Baby Royal" (with Swedm)	Moore; Rönnberg; Rosenberg; Hessman; Jacques Webster II; Aubrey Graham; Khalif Brown; John Hawkins; Chauncey Hollis; Ozan Yildirim; Brytavious Chambers; Tim Gomringer; Kevin Gomringer; Rogét Chahayed; Michael Dean; Cydel Young; Luther Campbell; Harry Wayne Casey; Richard Finch; Christopher Wallace; Osten Harvey; Bryan Higgins; Trevor Smith; James Jackson; Malik Taylor; Keith Elam; Chris E. Martin; Kamaal Fareed; Ali Jones-Muhammad; Tyrone Taylor; Fred Scruggs; Kirk Jones; Chylow Parker; Mirsad Dervić	Skrillex; Varg²™Whitearmor; Eurohead	0:51
30.	"G2G" (with Swedm and Badriia)	Moore; Brunn; Brady; Bourelly; Hessman; Rönnenberg	Skrillex; Brady; Virtual Riot; Varg2TM; Eurohead	1:47
31.	"DnB Ting" (with Majestic)	Moore; Kevin Christie	Skrillex	1:05
32.	"San Diego VIP"	Moore	Skrillex	1:40
33.	"Voltage"	Moore; John Feldmann	Skrillex; Feldmann	2:09
34.	"Azasu" (with Swedm and DJ Smokey)	Moore; Hessman; Rönnberg; Rosenberg; Jamesjamesjames	Skrillex; Jamesjamesjames; Varg2TM; Eurohead; Whitearmor; Virtual Riot	2:43
Total length:				46:27

Notes

- ^{^[a]} indicates an additional producer.
- ^{^[v]} indicates a vocal producer.
- All track titles are stylized in all caps.

Sample credits

- "Tears Lost Drop" is an alternate version of "Tears" from Quest for Fire and contains a sample of "I Never Knew", written by Fred Jerkins III, Rodney Jerkins, Isaac Phillips and LaShawn Daniels, and performed by Deborah Cox.
- "Andy" contains samples of "Top Off", written by Khaled Khaled, Shawn Carter, Nayvadius Wilburn, Beyoncé Knowles, and Joseph Zarrillo, as performed by DJ Khaled featuring Jay-Z, Future, and Beyoncé, and "U Don't Know Me (Like U Used To)", written by Brandy Norwood, Rodney Jerkins, Isaac Phillips, Paris Davis, and Sean Bryant, as performed by Brandy. This song was taken off streaming services in August 2026 because of a sample clearance issue with Sony.

== Personnel ==
Credits adapted from Tidal.

=== Musicians ===
- Skrillex – programming (all tracks), instrumentation (tracks 2–18, 20–34), vocals (6, 17, 33)
- Rex Kudo – programming (tracks 1, 8), instrumentation (8)
- Heavy Mellow – guitar (track 1)
- Peter Lee Johnson – strings (track 1)
- Hawaii Slim – vocals (track 2)
- Virtual Riot – instrumentation, programming (tracks 3, 6, 14–16, 30, 34)
- Naisha Barghabi (Note: Barghabi is credited as Nakeesha or Naisha on different tracks.) – vocals (tracks 3, 11, 14, 19), additional vocals (4)
- Salamimeats – additional vocals (track 5)
- Joker – programming (track 5)
- Sleepnet (Note: Roos is credited as Sleepnet or Nik Roos on different tracks.) – programming (tracks 5, 8), instrumentation (8), vocal producer (17)
- Space Laces – instrumentation, programming (track 7)
- ISOxo – instrumentation, programming (tracks 8, 11, 12, 14, 15, 25, 28)
- Badriia – vocals (tracks 8, 30)
- Carlton McDowell – instrumentation, programming (track 8)
- Dylan Wiggins – instrumentation, programming (track 8)
- Jónsi – instrumentation, programming (track 10)
- Ilykimchi – instrumentation, programming (track 12)
- Zacari – vocals (track 12)
- Starrah – vocals (track 12)
- Team EZY – instrumentation, programming (tracks 13, 19, 27)
- Njomza – vocals (tracks 13, 27)
- Eurohead – instrumentation (tracks 16, 18, 19, 27, 29, 30, 34), programming (16, 18, 19, 29, 30, 34), vocals (18)
- Varg2TM – programming (tracks 16, 18, 19, 27, 29, 30, 34), instrumentation (16, 18, 27, 29, 30, 34)
- Loam – vocals (track 16)
- Whitearmor – instrumentation, programming (tracks 18, 29, 34)
- Jamesjamesjames – instrumentation, programming (tracks 18, 34); vocals (18)
- Parisi – instrumentation, programming (track 18)
- Bgirl – vocals (track 18)
- Dilip – instrumentation (track 19)
- Dylan Brady – instrumentation, programming (tracks 20, 21, 30)
- Boys Noize – instrumentation (track 20)
- Kitty Kat – vocals (track 23)
- G Jones – instrumentation, programming (track 25)
- Wuki – instrumentation, programming (track 26)
- Vockah Redu – vocals (track 26)
- Royal Anderson – vocals (track 29)
- Swae Lee – vocals (track 29)
- Earth – guitar (track 30)
- Majestic – vocals (track 31)
- John Feldmann – instrumentation, programming (track 33)

=== Technical ===
- Skrillex – mastering, mixing, recording
- Luca Pretolesi – mastering, mixing
- Robert Guzman – mastering, mixing
- Virtual Riot – mastering, mixing
- Isoxo – mastering, mixing (tracks 11, 12, 14, 15)
- Drew Gold – recording (all tracks); mastering, mixing (track 6)
- Joker – recording (track 5)
- Sleepnet – recording (track 5)
- Nik Roos – recording (track 17)
- John Feldmann – recording (33)

== Charts ==
Chart performance for Fuck U Skrillex You Think Ur Andy Warhol but Ur Not!! <3
Chart (2025)	Peak position
Belgian Albums (Ultratop Flanders)	194
Canadian Albums (Billboard)	58
Japanese Digital Albums (Oricon)	28
Japanese Download Albums (Billboard Japan)	26
New Zealand Albums (RMNZ)	29
Norwegian Albums (VG-lista)	29
UK Album Downloads (Official Charts)	62
UK Dance Albums (Official Charts)	6
US Billboard 200	69
US Top Dance Albums (Billboard)	3
