= In da Getto =

2021 single by J Balvin and Skrillex

Single by J Balvin and Skrillex

from the album Jose
- Language: Spanish
- Released: 2 July 2021
- Genre: Reggaeton; house
- Length: 2:11
- Label: Universal Latin
- Songwriters: J Balvin; David Morales; Delta Bennett; Handel Tucker; Skrillex; Keityn; Sly Dunbar; Tainy
- Producers: Skrillex; Tainy

J Balvin singles chronology
| "AM (Remix)" (2021) | "In da Getto" (2021) | "Que Locura" (2021) |

Skrillex singles chronology
| "Supersonic (My Existence)" (2021) | "In da Getto" (2021) | "En Mi Cuarto" (2021) |

Music video
- "In da Getto" on YouTube

"In da Getto" is a song by Colombian singer J Balvin and American record producer Skrillex. It was released as a single on 2 July 2021, the fifth single from the album Jose. The song samples the 1993 song "In de Ghetto" by David Morales and Bad Yard.

== Critical reception ==
Reanna Cruz of NPR Music commented: "the song feels like an effortless blend from all parties, underscored by additional production from Latin music ringleader Tainy. 'In da Getto' is relentless and bound to keep energy up through a long night on the dance floor."

== Music video ==
The music video was directed by Alfred Marroquín. The video also features Senegalese-Italian TikTok comedy star Khaby Lame and dancer Jeff Obeng's Mufasa character, and follows Skrillex and Balvin on a night of debauchery, drinking and dancing before ending up at a rowdy house party.

== Charts ==
=== Weekly charts ===
Weekly performance for "In da Getto"
| Chart (2021) | Peak position |
|---|---|
| Argentina Hot 100 (Billboard) | 48 |
| Colombia (National-Report) | 1 |
| France (SNEP) | 43 |
| Germany (GfK) | 56 |
| Global 200 (Billboard) | 39 |
| India International Singles (IMI) | 16 |
| Italy (FIMI) | 34 |
| Lithuania (AGATA) | 98 |
| Netherlands (Single Top 100) | 57 |
| Portugal (AFP) | 28 |
| Romania (Airplay 100) | 59 |
| San Marino (SMRRTV Top 50) | 21 |
| Spain (PROMUSICAE) | 15 |
| Switzerland (Schweizer Hitparade) | 25 |
| US Billboard Hot 100 | 90 |
| US Hot Dance/Electronic Songs (Billboard) | 2 |
| US Hot Latin Songs (Billboard) | 5 |
| US Latin Airplay (Billboard) | 1 |

=== Year-end charts ===
2021 year-end chart performance for "In da Getto"
| Chart (2021) | Position |
|---|---|
| Global 200 (Billboard) | 198 |
| Spain (PROMUSICAE) | 74 |
| US Hot Dance/Electronic Songs (Billboard) | 10 |
| US Hot Latin Songs (Billboard) | 17 |

2022 year-end chart performance for "In da Getto"
| Chart (2022) | Position |
|---|---|
| US Hot Dance/Electronic Songs (Billboard) | 37 |

== Certifications ==
Certifications for "In da Getto"
| Region | Certification | Certified units/sales |
|---|---|---|
| Australia (ARIA) | Gold | 35,000^{‡} |
| Brazil (Pro-Música Brasil) | Platinum | 40,000^{‡} |
| France (SNEP) | Platinum | 200,000^{‡} |
| Italy (FIMI) | Platinum | 70,000^{‡} |
| Mexico (AMPROFON) | 2× Platinum+Gold | 350,000^{‡} |
| Poland (ZPAV) | Platinum | 50,000^{‡} |
| Portugal (AFP) | Gold | 5,000^{‡} |
| Spain (PROMUSICAE) | 2× Platinum | 80,000^{‡} |
^{‡} Sales+streaming figures based on certification alone.

== See also ==
- List of Billboard number-one Latin songs of 2021
