= Butterflies (Skrillex, Starrah and Four Tet song) =

2021 song by Skrillex, Four Tet, Starrah, and Bibi Bourelly

Single by Skrillex, Starrah and Four Tet

from the album Quest for Fire
- Released: May 10, 2021
- Recorded: February 2020
- Genre: House
- Length: 3:16
- Label: Owsla; Atlantic
- Songwriters: Sonny Moore; Brittany Hazzard; Kieran Hebden; Badriia Bourelly
- Producers: Skrillex; Four Tet

Skrillex singles chronology
"Ego Death" (2020)	"Butterflies" (2021)	"Too Bizarre" (2021)

Music video
- "Butterflies" on YouTube

"Butterflies" is a song by American record producer Skrillex, American singer-songwriter Starrah and British musician Four Tet. It was released as a single through Atlantic Records and Owsla on May 10, 2021. It was described as "nostalgic house" by NME.

== Background and release ==
The song was recorded in February 2020 but continued to be tweaked until a few weeks prior to release. In an interview with Annie Mac, Skrillex stated that he met up with Four Tet and produced the song, commenting that it was one of his last projects before the coronavirus lockdowns. In March 2021, Skrillex wrote on Instagram that he had new music coming "soon". The track was released on May 10, 2021.

Two edits were released, a 3:16 version and a 5:30 extended version.

== Personnel ==
The song was written by Skrillex, Four Tet, Starrah, and Bibi Bourelly. It was produced by Skrillex and Four Tet, and includes vocals from Starrah.

== Charts ==
Chart performance for "Butterflies"
Chart (2021)	Peak position
Mexico Ingles Airplay (Billboard)	13
New Zealand Hot Singles (RMNZ)	26
US Hot Dance/Electronic Songs (Billboard)	16
