= Weekends!!! =

Single by Skrillex featuring Sirah

from the EP My Name Is Skrillex
- Released: October 25, 2010
- Recorded: May 4, 2010
- Genre: Dubstep
- Length: 4:45
- Label: Big Beat; Atlantic
- Songwriter(s): Sonny Moore; Sara Mitchell
- Producer(s): Skrillex

Skrillex singles chronology
"Weekends!!!" (2010)	"Scary Monsters and Nice Sprites" (2010)

"Weekends!!!" (stylized in all caps) is the debut single by American electronic music producer Skrillex featuring vocals from American rapper Sirah. It was released by Big Beat and Atlantic Records on October 25, 2010, as the only single from his debut EP My Name Is Skrillex (2010).

The song was a pivotal track in Skrillex's early career, becoming a club-DJ favorite at underground clubs.

== Composition ==
The remix by Zedd was noted for its "heavy, bass-thumping new groove" that added weight to the original.

== Critical reception ==
Matthew Meadow of Your EDM said the song offers "a unique perspective into his first musical inspirations in electronic music". Nick Yopko of EDM.com said the song is the "perfect example of the energy Skrillex brings to the table".

== Track listing ==
Digital download
No.	Title	Writer(s)	Producer(s)	Length
1.	"Weekends!!!" (featuring Sirah)	Sonny Moore; Sara Mitchell	Skrillex	4:45
2.	"Weekends!!!" (Zedd remix)	Moore; Mitchell	Skrillex	5:23
Total length:				10:09

== Charts ==
Chart performance for "Weekends!!!"
Chart (2011–2012)	Peak position
Canada (Canadian Hot 100)	93
Germany (GfK)	100
US Dance Digital Song Sales (Billboard)	25

== Certifications ==
Certifications for "Weekends!!!"
Region	Certification	Certified units/sales
Canada (Music Canada)	Gold	40,000^{*}
United States (RIAA)	Gold	500,000^{‡}
^{*} Sales figures based on certification alone.^{‡} Sales+streaming figures based on certification alone.
