= Would You Ever =

Single by Skrillex featuring Poo Bear
- Released: July 26, 2017
- Recorded: 2017
- Genre: Deep house
- Length: 3:54
- Label: Owsla; Atlantic Records
- Songwriter(s): Sonny Moore; Jason Boyd
- Producer(s): Skrillex; JOYRYDE

Skrillex singles chronology
"Purple Lamborghini" (2016)	"Would You Ever" (2017)	"Saint Laurent" (2017)

Poo Bear singles chronology
"I'm On" (2011)	"Would You Ever" (2017)	""Will I See You"" (2017)

Music video
- "Would You Ever" on YouTube

"Would You Ever" is a song by American producer Skrillex featuring vocals from Jason "Poo Bear" Boyd. It is Boyd's first official single as a lead vocalist. The song was released through Skrillex's label Owsla and Atlantic Records. Skrillex and Boyd previously worked together on the Justin Bieber collaboration "Where Are Ü Now".

== Music video ==
The music video was released on July 26, 2017, on Skrillex's YouTube channel. It features professional longboard dancer Milan "Hairy Longboarder" Somerville, as well as appearances by Skrillex and Poo Bear. The longboard portion of the video was filmed near the intersection of Fort Tejon Road and Largo Vista Road in the small town of Llano in Los Angeles County. The scene that included Skrillex and Poo Bear was filmed on the cliffs of Corona Del Mar Main Beach, a neighborhood of Newport Beach in Orange County, California.

== Charts ==
=== Weekly charts ===
Chart (2017)	Peak position
Australia (ARIA)	42
Belgium (Ultratip Bubbling Under Flanders)	3
Canada (Canadian Hot 100)	61
Czech Republic (Singles Digitál Top 100)	36
Ireland (IRMA)	65
New Zealand Heatseekers (RMNZ)	2
Portugal (AFP)	72
Scotland (OCC)	52
Slovakia (Rádio Top 100)	73
Slovakia (Singles Digitál Top 100)	36
Sweden (Sverigetopplistan)	91
Switzerland (Schweizer Hitparade)	63
UK Singles (OCC)	55
US Bubbling Under Hot 100 (Billboard)	24
US Hot Dance/Electronic Songs (Billboard)	16

=== Year-end charts ===
Chart (2017)	Position
US Hot Dance/Electronic Songs (Billboard)	40

== Certifications ==
Certifications for "Would You Ever"
Region	Certification	Certified units/sales
Australia (ARIA)	2× Platinum	140,000^{‡}
Canada (Music Canada)	Gold	40,000^{‡}
New Zealand (RMNZ)	Platinum	30,000^{‡}
United Kingdom (BPI)	Silver	200,000^{‡}
United States (RIAA)	Gold	500,000^{‡}
^{‡} Sales+streaming figures based on certification alone.
