= Favor (Vindata song) =

Single by Vindata, Skrillex and NSTASIA
- Released: August 8, 2017
- Genre: Future bass
- Length: 3:42
- Label: Owsla
- Songwriters: Jason Boyd: Ashley Nastasia Griffin; Sonny Moore; Branden Ratcliff * Jared Poythress

Skrillex singles chronology
"Saint Laurent" (2017)	"Favor" (2017)	"So Am I" (2017)

Vindata singles chronology
"Heartbreak" (2017)	"Favor" (2017)

"Favor" is a song by American producers Vindata and Skrillex, and American-Haitian vocalist NSTASIA. It was released on August 8, 2017, via Owsla.

== Production ==
Described as progressive melodic dance-pop, the song is composed of warm chords and a 'flute-driven' drop. The official audio was released on Owsla's YouTube channel on August 7, 2017. NSTASIA's multi-layered vocal harmonies are credited as why "the production sounds grand and immersive".
