= Vindata =

American electronic musical duo

- Origin: Los Angeles, U.S.
- Genres: Electronic; R&B; hip hop; future bass
- Occupations: Musicians; producers; DJs
- Instrument: Digital audio workstation
- Years active: 2010–present
- Labels: Owsla; PRMD; Symbols Recordings; Shake Your Ass Recordings; Monstercat
- Members: Branden Ratcliff
- Past members: Jared Poythress

Branden Ratcliff, also known as Vindata, is a producer/DJ based in Los Angeles. The project was formerly a duo with Jared Poythress. In March 2017, they were featured on Rolling Stone's list of 10 New Artists You Need to Know Now. They gained recognition with a single featuring Kenzie May, "All I Really Need." Shortly after, Skrillex signed them to a record deal at Owsla where they released Through Time and Space featuring Kenzie May again as well as Anderson .Paak, Chuck Ellis and Kaleena Zanders and Mack.

Their first official artistic collaboration with Skrillex came in August 2017 with the "uplifting, vibrant", "Favor."

== Career and musical style ==
In 2013, Vindata released their debut EP titled "For One to Follow" on Symbols Recordings alongside a remix of ODESZA's "Without You". In 2014, they released "Where You Are", a collaboration with Sweater Beats and Bella Hunter. In 2014, they released the song "All I Really Need" as a single featuring Kenzie May. In 2015, they signed to Skrillex's label Owsla with their song "Continuum" featuring on the label's spring compilation album. Their second EP, "Through Time and Space" was released in August the same year, featuring songs such as "Own Life" which received its own remix package with remixes from Shift K3y and Rene LaVice. In 2016, Vindata released the single "Better" with Mija. A music video for the song was also released. They also collaborated with Australian DJ Wax Motif for the song "Crazy". In 2017, they released "Right Now" with Njomza and Alex & Alex.

On November 13, 2021, the departure of Jared Poythress was announced, with Branden Ratcliff continuing Vindata as a solo project.

On June 4, 2021, Vindata released their first album "With Opened Eyes". The lead single for the album was "Let it Go", released January 29 of that year. On February 16, "Good 4 Me" and "Union" was released as a joint-single, with the latter song being featured on the Rocket League title screen soundtrack. The entire album was available for streaming the upload of its final single "Skin (I Give Into You)".

== Discography ==
=== Albums ===
Title	Details
With Opened Eyes	Released: June 4, 2021; Label: Monstercat; Format: Digital download, vinyl

=== Extended plays ===
Title	Details
For One to Follow	Released: March 4, 2014; Label: Symbols Recordings; Format: Digital download, CD
Through Time and Space...	Released: August 14, 2015; Label: Owsla; Format: Digital download, CD

=== Singles ===
Title	Year	Album
"Where You Are" (with Sweater Beats & Bella Hunter)	2014	Non-album single
"All I Really Need" (featuring Kenzie May)	2014	For One To Follow
"Better" (with Mija)	2016	Non-album singles
"Can't Say No" (featuring Chuck Ellis)	2016	Non-album singles
"Own Life" (featuring Anderson .Paak)	2016	Non-album singles
"Crazy" (with Wax Motif)		Non-album singles
"Heartbreak" (Fat Joe & Remy Ma featuring The-Dream & Vindata)	2017	Non-album singles
"Right Now" (featuring Njomza and Alex & Alex)	2017	Non-album singles
"Favor" (featuring Skrillex & NSTASIA)	2017	Non-album singles
"6 Ft."	2018	

=== Remixes ===
2012

- Little Dragon – Little Man (Vindata Remix)

2013

- ODESZA – Without You (Vindata Remix)

2014

- Jack Ü – Take Ü There (Vindata Remix)
- Ellie Goulding – Beating Heart (Vindata Remix)
- Alex Metric – Heart Weighs a Ton (Vindata Remix)
- Camden Arc – Is It Good To You (Vindata Remix)

2015

- Hoodboi – By Ur Side (Vindata Remix)
- Clean Bandit – Stronger (Vindata Remix)

2016

- Kenzie May – Never Find Another (Vindata Remix)
