= Don't Go (Skrillex, Justin Bieber and Don Toliver song) =

2021 single by Skrillex, Justin Bieber, and Don Toliver

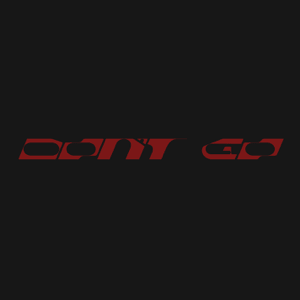

Single by Skrillex, Justin Bieber, and Don Toliver

from the album Don't Get Too Close
- Released: August 20, 2021
- Genre: R&B
- Length: 2:48
- Label: Atlantic; Owsla
- Songwriters: Sonny Moore; Justin Bieber; Caleb Toliver; Bernard Harvey; Jason Boyd; Tyshane Thompson; Gregory Hein; Carlton McDowell, Jr.; Jordan Douglas; Drew Gold
- Producers: Skrillex; Harv

Skrillex singles chronology
"En Mi Cuarto" (2021)	"Don't Go" (2021)	"Horizon" (2022)

Justin Bieber singles chronology
"Essence" (Remix) (2021)	"Don't Go" (2021)	"Ghost" (2021)

Don Toliver singles chronology
"Drugs n Hella Melodies" (2021)	"Don't Go" (2021)	"Way Bigger" (2021)

Music video
- "Don't Go" on YouTube

"Don't Go" is a song by American record producer Skrillex, Canadian singer Justin Bieber, and American rapper and singer Don Toliver. It was released as a single through Atlantic Records and Owsla on August 20, 2021. Production was handled by Skrillex and Harv, while the vocals were handled by Bieber and Toliver. All four wrote the song alongside Poo Bear, Beam, Aldae, Carlton McDowell, Jr., Jordan Douglas, and Drew Gold.

== Background ==
Speaking about "Don't Go", Skrillex explained that he thought of Bieber while creating the instrumental, with Toliver later being part of the song. He further said: "The song is a beautiful mess of organic energy melting together. For every 100 people listening to it, I hope there are 100 different interpretations". The song was originally supposed to appear on Bieber's sixth studio album, Justice (2021), but did not end up making the final cut of the album, which led to the song later being released as a single as himself and Skrillex thought that it was "fire".

== Composition and lyrics ==
"Don't Go" is an R&B song that is set in the key of B major with a tempo of 135 beats per minute. It contains "vibrant" bass-heavy production and finds Bieber and Toliver singing about their respective significant others to remain by their side. On the chorus, Bieber sings: "I put in the work to hear you say (Don't go, don't—)/ Misery missin' your company (Don't go, don't go)/ See 'em pullin' at you that way (Don't go, don't)/ Ooh, if this is where you supposed to be (Don't go)". Bieber and Australian rapper and singer the Kid Laroi discussed a similar theme on their chart-topping 2021 single, "Stay".

== Release and promotion ==
On October 28, 2020, Skrillex and Bieber were seen recording in a music studio alongside producers and songwriters Harv and Poo Bear, along with Jon Bellion, Maejor, and Ant Clemons, among others. The two announced the collaboration and release date of the song on August 16, 2021. Two days later, the two artists revealed the title of the song along with a snippet, in which the cover art was revealed as part of the pre-save.

== Critical reception ==
Upon release, "Don't Go" received positive reviews from music critics, majority of whom praised Skrillex's production and his chemistry with Bieber on the track. Two days before the song was released, on August 18, 2021, Jason Heffler of EDM felt that Skrillex, Bieber, and Toliver have "cooked up a woozy R&B banger, a slow-burner rife with the hypnotic yet forceful bass of a contemporary Skrillex production", basing it on the snippet that was shared that day. Karlie Powell of Your EDM stated that "the production is smooth as can be with a booming baseline, accented by creative rhythm and flow" and "if it sounds like a hit, it's probably a hit!". Writing for Billboard, Katie Bain felt that "the song is a dreamy R&B number, with Skrillex's production sitting well back to enable Bieber and Toliver's vocals to dominate". Shaad D'Souza of Paper wrote that the pairing of Bieber and Skrillex resulted in "a woozier, looser song than we've come to expect", but still called it "brilliant and infectious". Uproxx's Carolyn Droke felt that the combination of "acoustic guitar and a network of electronic notes for a moving beat" made for "intricate production". Issy Sampson of The Guardian called the track "a moody, moany banger" and "an overdue return to form for the Bieber".

== Music video ==
The official music video for "Don't Go", directed by Salomon Ligthelm, premiered to Skrillex's YouTube channel alongside the song on August 20, 2021. It sees himself, Bieber, and Toliver surrounded in an art museum that shows art of them at different exhibits. The paintings have tears coming from them. Before the video ends, all artists turn to gold.

== Credits and personnel ==
- Skrillex – production, songwriting, all instruments, programming, mixing
- Justin Bieber – vocals, songwriting
- Don Toliver – vocals, songwriting
- Harv – production, songwriting, guitar, all instruments, programming
- Poo Bear – songwriting
- Beam – songwriting
- Aldae – songwriting
- Carlton McDowell, Jr. – songwriting, guitar
- Jordan Douglas – songwriting
- Drew Gold – songwriting, recording
- Josh Gudwin – vocal production, recording
- Derek "206Derek" Anderson – recording
- Dhamari Trice Hanson “DhamariTH” - guitar production
- Manny Marroquin – mixing
- Mike Bozzi – mastering

== Charts ==
Chart performance for "Don't Go"
Chart (2021–2023)	Peak position
Australia (ARIA)	43
Australia Hip Hop/R&B (ARIA)	12
Canada Hot 100 (Billboard)	32
Canada CHR/Top 40 (Billboard)	44
Global 200 (Billboard)	38
Hungary (Single Top 40)	40
Ireland (IRMA)	55
Japan Hot Overseas (Billboard)	10
Netherlands (Single Tip)	3
New Zealand Hot Singles (RMNZ)	7
Portugal (AFP)	174
Romania (Airplay 100)	91
South Africa (RISA)	87
Sweden (Sverigetopplistan)	67
Switzerland (Schweizer Hitparade)	98
UK Singles (OCC)	56
US Billboard Hot 100	69
US Hot Dance/Electronic Songs (Billboard)	43
US Rhythmic Airplay (Billboard)	24

== Release history ==
Release dates and formats for "Don't Go"
Country	Date	Format	Label	Ref.
Various	August 20, 2021	Digital download; streaming	Atlantic; Owsla	
United States	August 31, 2021	Rhythmic contemporary radio	Atlantic; Owsla	
