= Purple Lamborghini =

Single by Skrillex and Rick Ross

from the album Suicide Squad: The Album
- Released: July 22, 2016
- Recorded: 2016
- Genre: Hip hop; EDM
- Length: 3:35
- Label: Owsla; Atlantic
- Songwriters: Sonny Moore; William Roberts; Shamann Cooke
- Producers: Skrillex; Beat Billionaire

Skrillex singles chronology
"Killa" (2016)	"Purple Lamborghini" (2016)	"Would You Ever" (2017)

Rick Ross singles chronology
"Make It Work" (2016)	"Purple Lamborghini" (2016)	"Do You Mind" (2016)

Suicide Squad singles chronology
"Sucker for Pain" (2016)	"Purple Lamborghini" (2016)	"Gangsta" (2016)

Music video
- "Purple Lamborghini" on YouTube

"Purple Lamborghini" is a song by American DJ Skrillex and American rapper Rick Ross. It was released as a single for the motion picture soundtrack for the 2016 DC Comics film Suicide Squad on July 22, 2016, by Atlantic Records and Owsla. In the music video, Jared Leto reprises his role as The Joker from the film. "Purple Lamborghini" received a nomination for Best Song Written for Visual Media at the 59th Annual Grammy Awards. "Purple Lamborghini" peaked at number 33 on the Billboard Hot 100.

== Background ==
The artists co-wrote the song with Beat Billionaire, who co-produced it with Skrillex. The song contains multiple references to characters and motifs in the movie, including references to Killer Croc, Deadshot and Gotham City. It is possibly written from the perspective of the Joker, featured in both the film and music video, who is known for his affinity for purple; he wears a purple crocodile-leather trench coat, utilises purple colored weapons, and drives a purple Infiniti G35 with a Vaydor body kit.

== Critical reception ==
Pitchfork said that the track "is almost intuitive. And Ross sounds more energetic than he has in a while, the bass clawing down to his lowest frequencies."

== Music video ==
Skrillex uploaded the music video in August 2016, directed by Colin Tilley, onto his YouTube account which features himself, Rick Ross and Jared Leto as The Joker.

In an interview with Complex, Skrillex said that it was his idea to have Leto reprise his role as The Joker in the music video: "[The film's producers] wanted to do a music video using me and footage [of the film]. I was like, 'No, I don’t want to do one of those'. So I called Jared personally, and I really had to persuade him [to join]. He's a really good friend of mine, but for him, giving me that Joker character is not an easy thing. He really went out of his way to be a part of that video".

In that same interview, Skrillex also said that while filming the music video, Leto gifted him a box full of "a bunch of weird shit", as well as a dildo, which he described as "the biggest" he had ever seen. He responded to Leto's gifts in an awkward fashion: "I was just like, 'Thank you'". Leto's gifts to Skrillex were another one of the many crude gifts that the actor had previously given to other cast and crew members whilst on-set of the Suicide Squad movie; some of Leto's previous gifts included anal beads, used condoms and a dead pig.

Skrillex also helped co-edit and co-produce the music video alongside Vinnie Hobbs and Andrew Leiros, respectively.

Ironically, the music video for "Purple Lamborghini" does not feature an actual purple Lamborghini vehicle, as Skrillex stated in a Tweet that the company were unable to give Tilley and Atlantic Records clearance to use one in the video.

== Track listing ==
Digital download
No.	Title	Length
1.	"Purple Lamborghini"	3:35

== Charts ==
=== Weekly charts ===
Chart (2016–2017)	Peak position
Australia (ARIA)	39
Austria (Ö3 Austria Top 40)	56
Belgium (Ultratip Bubbling Under Flanders)	36
Belgium (Ultratip Bubbling Under Wallonia)	31
Canada Hot 100 (Billboard)	28
Czech Republic Singles Digital (ČNS IFPI)	41
France (SNEP)	58
Germany (GfK)	85
Hungary (Single Top 40)	18
Ireland (IRMA)	88
Italy (FIMI)	67
New Zealand (Recorded Music NZ)	34
Portugal (AFP)	57
Scotland Singles (Official Charts)	41
Slovakia Singles Digital (ČNS IFPI)	23
Sweden Heatseeker (Sverigetopplistan)	4
UK Singles (Official Charts)	61
US Billboard Hot 100	33
US Hot Dance/Electronic Songs (Billboard)	6
US Hot Rap Songs (Billboard)	7

=== Year-end charts ===
Chart (2016)	Position
US Hot Dance/Electronic Songs (Billboard)	20
Chart (2017)	Position
US Hot Dance/Electronic Songs (Billboard)	45

== Certifications ==
Region	Certification	Certified units/sales
Australia (ARIA)	2× Platinum	140,000^{‡}
Canada (Music Canada)	Gold	40,000^{‡}
Italy (FIMI)	Gold	25,000^{‡}
New Zealand (RMNZ)	Platinum	30,000^{‡}
Poland (ZPAV)	Gold	25,000^{‡}
United Kingdom (BPI)	Silver	200,000^{‡}
United States (RIAA)	Platinum	1,000,000^{‡}
^{‡} Sales+streaming figures based on certification alone.

== Release history ==
Region	Date	Format	Label	Ref.
Worldwide	July 22, 2016	Digital download; streaming	Atlantic; Owsla	
