= Don't Get Too Close =

Studio album by Skrillex
- Released: February 18, 2023
- Genres: Emo rap; urban pop
- Length: 33:35
- Labels: Owsla; Atlantic
- Producer: Skrillex

Skrillex chronology
Quest for Fire (2023)	Don't Get Too Close (2023)	Fuck U Skrillex You Think Ur Andy Warhol but Ur Not!! <3 (2025)

Singles from Don't Get Too Close
- 1. "Don't Go" Released: August 20, 2021; 2. "Way Back" Released: January 5, 2023; 3. "Real Spring" Released: January 26, 2023; 4. "Don't Get Too Close" Released: February 13, 2023

Don't Get Too Close is the third studio album by American record producer Skrillex. It was released on February 18, 2023, through Owsla and Atlantic Records. It was released the day after his album Quest for Fire, with both records being announced and promoted simultaneously. It was preceded by the singles "Way Back" (with PinkPantheress and Trippie Redd), "Real Spring" (with Bladee), and "Don't Get Too Close" (with Bibi Bourelly). Skrillex is also separately credited as "Sonny Moore" on the title track, and is featured as a vocalist for the first time since 2015's Skrillex and Diplo Present Jack Ü.

== Promotion and release ==
Skrillex teased the album on social media alongside Quest for Fire on January 1, 2023, with a message hinting at the names of the two albums, and their release later that year. A snippet of samples from both albums was uploaded, alongside an animation featuring the two "ill" logos that he uses for each album.

The title and album artwork were officially revealed on February 13, 2023, alongside the music video for the title track.

The album was surprise-released during Skrillex's performance at Madison Square Garden, alongside Fred Again and Four Tet, on February 18, 2023.

== Critical reception ==
Professional ratings
Aggregate scores
Source	Rating
Metacritic	72/100
Review scores
Source	Rating
The Line of Best Fit	7/10
MusicOMH	3.5/5 stars
Pitchfork	7.3/10
Resident Advisor	6/10
Spectrum Culture	3/5 stars
Sputnikmusic	2.5/5
Tom Hull	B+

According to the review aggregator Metacritic, Don't Get Too Close received "generally favorable reviews" based on a weighted average score of 72 out of 100 from 4 critic scores. Reviewing the album for Pitchfork, Chal Ravens described it as "the more adventurous but marginally less successful" of Skrillex's second and third albums, and wrote that Skrillex "scores the interior world of our hero's adventure in a very-now merger of emo, rap, J-pop, memecore, video game music, and angsty boy-girl duets". Ravens also found the album to be "intriguingly weird" and "likely to confound the older fans while opening new doors for Skrillex as a collaborator". David Cobbald of The Line of Best Fit felt the inclusion of "Don't Go" makes the album "more of a pop record than Quest For Fire" and questioned "whether this record would've been better if it was released first" as it "adds a certain depth to its predecessor" despite "the albums still work[ing] as a pair" regardless. Ben Devlin of MusicOMH found the album to be "shorter and considerably more patchy" than Quest for Fire, with "gargly autotune" from Chief Keef on "Bad for Me", the child vocals on "3am" becoming "tedious quickly" and the lyrics on "Don't Get Too Close" sounding "like one big in-joke", which "completely tanks the project's momentum", summarizing that the best songs amount "to a great EP".

== Track listing ==
Don't Get Too Close track listing
No.	Title	Writer(s)	Producer(s)	Length
1.	"Don't Leave Me Like This" (with Bobby Raps)	Skrillex; Robert Richardson	Skrillex; Mike Einziger	1:42
2.	"Way Back" (with PinkPantheress and Trippie Redd)	Skrillex; Corbin Smidzik; Daniel Harle; Dylan Wiggins; Masamune Kudo; Victoria Walker	Skrillex; Wiggins; PinkPantheress; Rex Kudo; Harle^{[a]}	1:59
3.	"Selecta" (with Beam)	Skrillex; Christian Ward; Theron Thomas; Tyshane Thompson	Skrillex; Chris Lake^{[a]}	3:10
4.	"Ceremony" (with Yung Lean and Bladee)	Skrillex; Benjamin Reichwald; Carl-Mikael Berlander; Wiggins; Jonatan Håstad; Kudo	Skrillex; Wiggins; Kudo; Gud^{[a]}	3:12
5.	"Real Spring" (with Bladee)	Skrillex; Reichwald	Skrillex	2:09
6.	"Summertime" (with Kid Cudi)	Skrillex; Scott Mescudi	Skrillex	2:11
7.	"Bad for Me" (with Corbin and Chief Keef)	Skrillex; Smidzik; Richardson; Keith Cozart; Peder Losnegård	Skrillex; Bobby Raps; Lido^{[a]}	2:53
8.	"3am" (with Prentiss and Anthony Green)	Skrillex; Anthony Green; Daniel Aranson; Henry Furr	Skrillex; DxnnyFxntom^{[a]}	3:26
9.	"Don't Go" (with Justin Bieber and Don Toliver)	Skrillex; Thompson; Bernard Harvey; Caleb Toliver; Carlton McDowell Jr; Drew Gold; Gregory Hein; Jason Boyd; Jordan Douglas; Justin Bieber	Skrillex; Harv; Josh Gudwin^{[v]}	2:48
10.	"Don't Get Too Close" (with Bibi Bourelly)	Skrillex; Losnegård; Badriia Bourelly	Skrillex; Lido	4:04
11.	"Mixed Signals" (with Swae Lee)	Skrillex; Kudo; Christian Brunn; Khalif Brown; Peter Lee Johnson	Skrillex; Kudo; Virtual Riot	2:46
12.	"Painting Rainbows" (with Bibi Bourelly)	Skrillex; Bourelly; Jamil Pierre	Skrillex; Deputy; Jae5^{[a]}	3:15
Total length:				33:35

Notes

- ^{^[a]} signifies an additional producer
- ^{^[v]} signifies a vocal producer

== Personnel ==
Musicians

- Skrillex – instruments, programming (all tracks), vocals (5, 10)
- Bobby Raps – vocals (1), instruments, programming (7)
- Nai Barghouti – additional vocals (1)
- PinkPantheress – instruments, programming, vocals (2)
- Danny L Harle – instruments, programming (2)
- Dylan Wiggins – instruments, programming (2, 4)
- Trippie Redd – vocals (2)
- Theron Thomas – additional vocals (3)
- Beam – vocals (3)
- Rex Kudo – instruments, programming (4, 11)
- Bladee – vocals (4, 5)
- Yung Lean – vocals (4)
- Kid Cudi – vocals (6)
- Lido – instruments, programming (7, 10)
- Chief Keef – vocals (7)
- Corbin – vocals (7)
- Dxnnyfxntm – instruments, programming (8)
- Anthony Green – vocals (8)
- Prentiss – vocals (8)
- Harv – instruments, guitar, programming (9)
- Carlton McDowell – guitar (9)
- Don Toliver – vocals (9)
- Justin Bieber – vocals (9)
- Bibi Bourelly – vocals (10, 12)
- Virtual Riot – programming (11)
- Peter Lee Johnson – synthesizer (11)
- Swae Lee – vocals (11)

Technical

- Skrillex – mixing (all tracks), mastering (1–8, 10–12), engineering (1–8, 10–12)
- Luca Pretolesi – mixing, mastering (2)
- Chris Lake – mixing (3)
- Tom Norris – mixing (4, 5, 8, 10, 12), mastering (5)
- Manny Marroquin – mixing (9)
- Mike Bozzi – mastering (9)
- Drew Gold – engineering
- William Sullivan – engineering (6)
- Kenny Harmon – engineering, vocal mixing (7)
- Derek "206derek" Anderson – engineering (9)
- Josh Gudwin – engineering (9)
- Lelievre Mickael – album cover artwork

== Charts ==
Chart performance for Don't Get Too Close
Chart (2023)	Peak position
UK Album Downloads (Official Charts)	84
US Top Dance Albums (Billboard)	6
