= Skrillex =

American DJ and producer (born 1988)

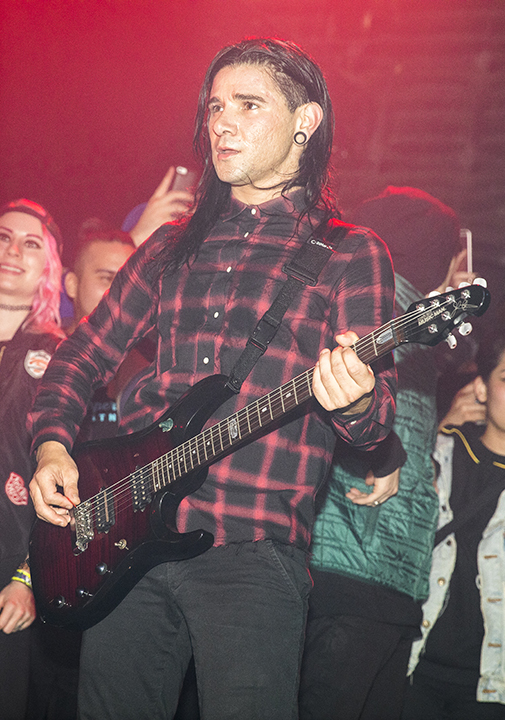
- Moore performing with From First to Last in 2017

Background information
- Also known as: Twipz; Sonny
- Born: Sonny John Moore; January 15, 1988 (age 38); Los Angeles, California, U.S.
- Genres: Dubstep; brostep; EDM; electro house; pop; post-hardcore; emo
- Occupations: DJ; record producer; singer; musician
- Works: Discography
- Years active: 2004–present
- Labels: Atlantic; Big Beat; Owsla; Asylum; mau5trap; Sumerian
- Member of: Dog Blood
- Formerly of: Jack Ü; From First to Last
- Website: skrillex.com

Sonny John Moore (born January 15, 1988), known professionally as Skrillex, is an American DJ, record producer, singer, and musician. Raised in Northeast Los Angeles and Northern California, he began his career in 2004 as the lead vocalist of the post-hardcore band From First to Last. He recorded their first two studio albums with the band, Dear Diary, My Teen Angst Has a Bodycount (2004) and Heroine (2006), before leaving to pursue a solo career in 2007. He began his first tour as a solo artist in late 2007. After recruiting a new band lineup, Moore joined the Alternative Press Tour to support bands such as All Time Low and the Rocket Summer, and appeared on the cover of Alternative Press's annual "100 Bands You Need to Know" issue.

After releasing the extended play Gypsyhook (2009), Moore was scheduled to record his debut studio album, Bells, with producer Noah Shain. Although its release was cancelled, he began performing under the name Skrillex and released the dubstep EP, My Name Is Skrillex (2010), as a free download on MySpace. It was followed by Scary Monsters and Nice Sprites (2010) and More Monsters and Sprites (2011), both of which were moderate commercial successes. At the 54th Grammy Awards, he won Best Dance/Electronic Album, Best Dance Recording, and Best Remixed Recording, Non-Classical, as well as a nomination for Best New Artist. In late 2011, he was nominated on the BBC's Sound of 2012, and was named MTV's Electronic Dance Music Artist of the Year. His debut studio album, Recess (2014) peaked at number four on the Billboard 200. His second and third albums, Quest for Fire and Don't Get Too Close, were released one day apart in 2023. His fourth album, Fuck U Skrillex You Think Ur Andy Warhol but Ur Not!! <3, was surprise released in 2025.

Moore has won nine Grammy Awards, the most of any electronic dance music act. He has collaborated with Diplo and Boys Noize to form the groups Jack Ü and Dog Blood, respectively. It was announced on his 29th birthday that he had reunited with From First to Last to release a single named "Make War". In 2017, Skrillex produced and mixed 8, the eighth studio album by rock band Incubus.

== Early life ==
At birth, Moore was adopted by family friends of his biological parents. They lived in the Highland Park neighborhood of Northeast Los Angeles, California, but relocated to the Forest Hill neighborhood of San Francisco at the age of 2, where he attended elementary school. At the ages of 9 and 10, Moore attended a boarding school in Barstow, but eventually moved back to Northern California. Both of his parents were Scientologists. By the time he was 12, the family returned to Northeast Los Angeles. There he enrolled in a private academy school specializing in arts that used some of L. Ron Hubbard's teachings. Later, he was home schooled at the age of 14 due to bullying. In 2004, he learned he was adopted, and dropped out of the program when he was 16. While a young teenager in Los Angeles, Moore would attend punk gigs in Mexican American neighborhoods in East and South Los Angeles, and later at electro club raves in the Silver Lake and Echo Park neighborhoods.

== Career ==
=== 2004–2007: From First to Last ===
In 2004, Moore contacted Matt Good of From First to Last about playing guitar for the band on their debut album. After flying out to Georgia, Moore was heard singing by three studio producers, Derrick Thomas, Eric Dale, and McHale Butler, and was then made lead singer, with Good playing guitar. In June 2004, Epitaph Records released the band's first full-length record with their new bandmate, Dear Diary, My Teen Angst Has a Body Count. After performing on several successful tours, two being the Vans Warped Tour and Dead by Dawn tour, they began recording their second album, Heroine with producer Ross Robinson. The album was released in March 2006 on Epitaph. With high record sales once again, the band found themselves part of many successful tours, until Moore started suffering vocal problems, causing the band to resign from several tours. After going through a successful vocal surgical procedure, Moore informed the band he would be permanently resigning to work on a solo career. FFTL's last show performed with Moore was in their hometown of Orlando at The House of Blues while touring with Atreyu.

Moore announced he had left From First to Last to pursue a solo career. He then launched a Myspace page displaying three demos ("Signal", "Equinox", and "Glow Worm"). This led to Moore's first performance since his leaving From First to Last. On April 7, 2007, alongside harpist Carol Robbins, Moore played several original songs at a local art building. After months of releasing demos via Myspace, Moore played on the Team Sleep Tour with a full band. The tour also featured supporting acts Monster in the Machine and Strata. Moore made several demo CDs available on this tour, limited to about 30 per show. These CDs were tour exclusive and were packaged in "baby blue envelopes", each with a unique drawing by Moore or bandmate.

=== 2008–2013: Solo career and extended plays ===
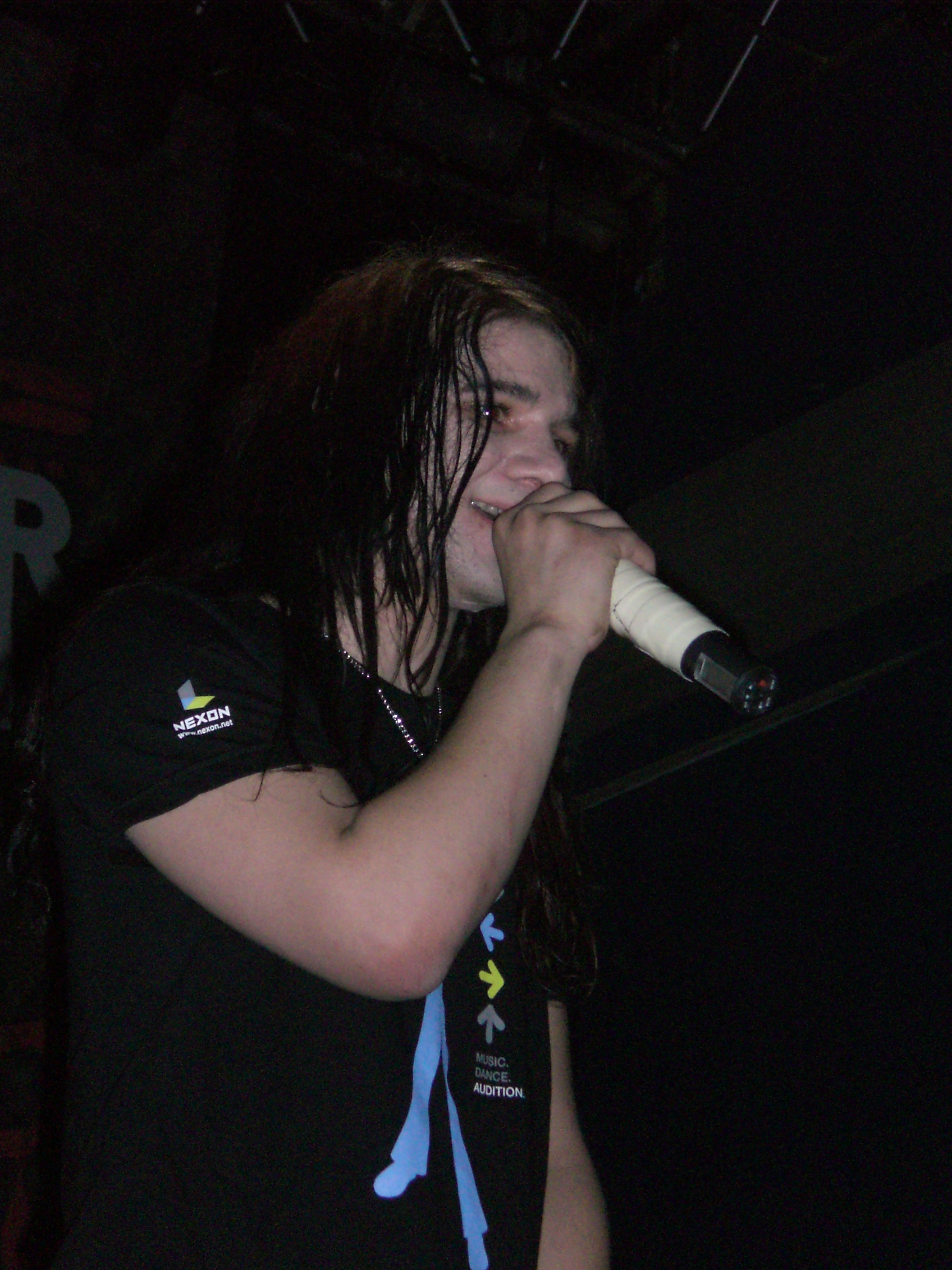
Moore performing in 2008

In February 2008, Alternative Press Magazine announced the second annual AP Tour, with All Time Low, The Rocket Summer, The Matches, and Forever the Sickest Kids, as well as Sonny Moore. The tour started in Houston, Texas on March 14 and went through North America, ending in Cleveland, Ohio on May 2, with the majority of the shows being sold out. All bands playing the tour would be featured on the cover of Alternative Press Magazine's annual 100 Bands You Need to Know special, and would be interviewed on the Alternative Press Podcast. During this tour, Moore's line-up consisted of Sean Friday on drums, Christopher Null on guitar, and Aaron Rothe on keyboards. On April 7, 2009, he released Gypsyhook, a digital EP, which featured three songs and four remixes. Also included was "海水" ("Kaisui"), a Japanese version of "Mora". Physical copies of the EP were available at his shows. After going on tour with Innerpartysystem and Paper Route and opening for Chiodos on their European tour, Moore performed at Bamboozle on May 2. He performed on Bamboozle Left's Saints and Sinners stage on April 4. He toured with Hollywood Undead in April 2009 performing under the band name "Sonny and the Blood Monkeys", with Chris Null (electric guitar), Sean Friday (drums, percussion, and beats) and Aaron Rothe (keyboards, synthesizers, programming, and turntables). Moore stated in 2010 that the album Bells would not be released.

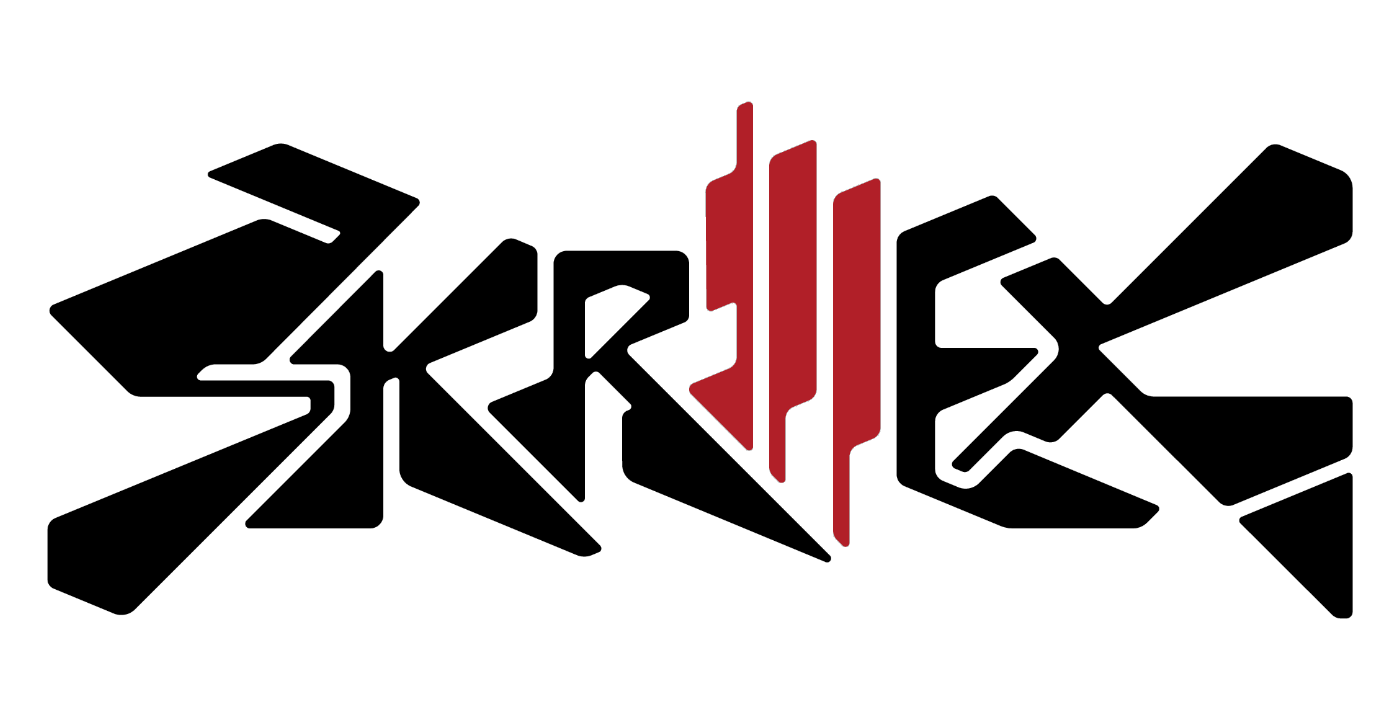
Skrillex's logo

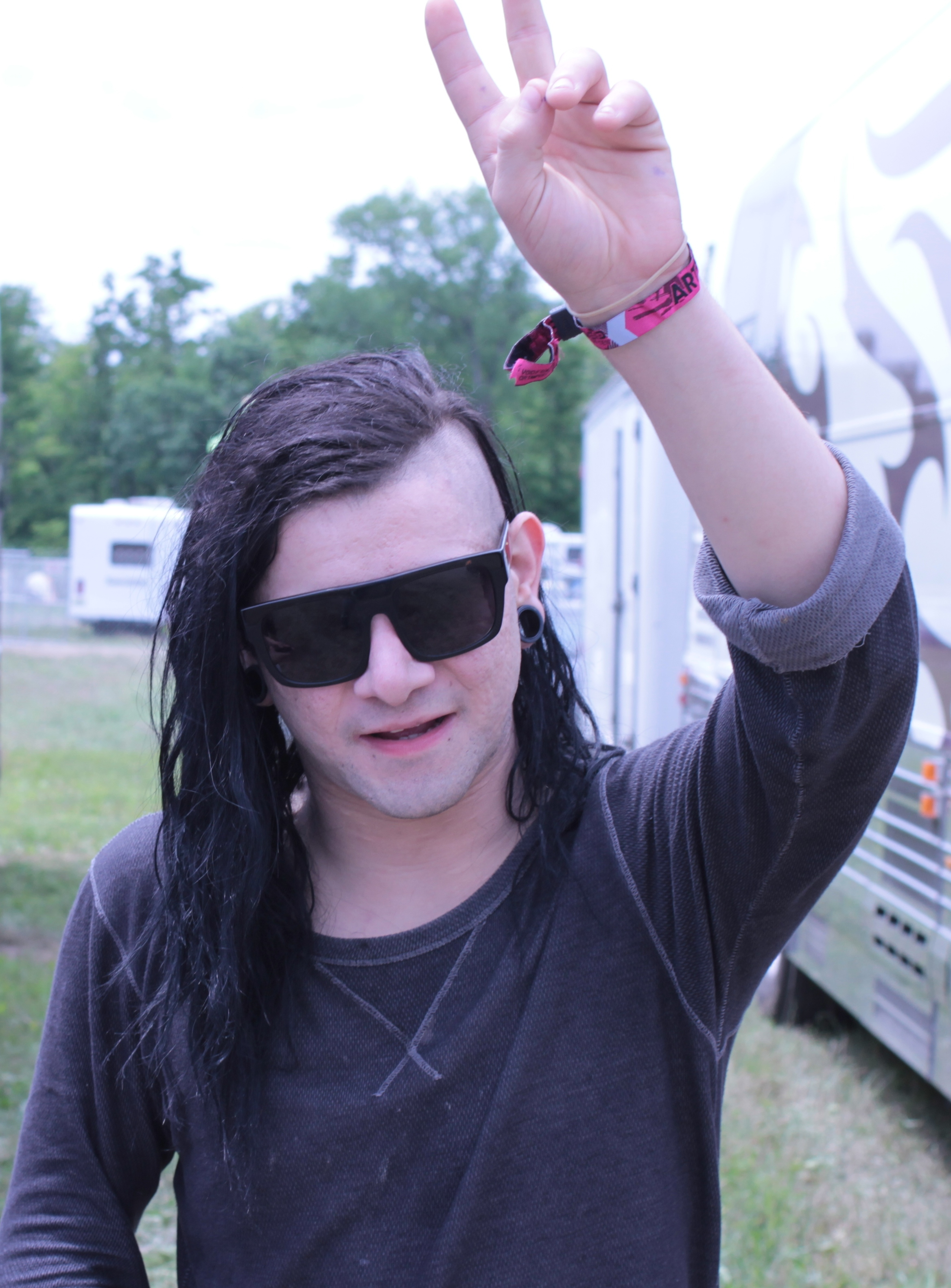
Skrillex in 2011

In 2008, Moore began producing and performing under the alias "Skrillex" at clubs in the Los Angeles area. The name, according to Moore, has no meaning and was "a stupid old online AOL screen name". Previously, he had been known on the Internet as Twipz. On June 7, 2010, Moore released his official Skrillex debut EP, My Name Is Skrillex, as a free download. Moore provided programming and vocals for UK metalcore band Bring Me the Horizon on their third studio album, There Is a Hell Believe Me I've Seen It. There Is a Heaven Let's Keep It a Secret. Later in the year, Sonny began a nationwide tour with Deadmau5 after being signed to Mau5trap recordings and released his second EP, Scary Monsters and Nice Sprites.

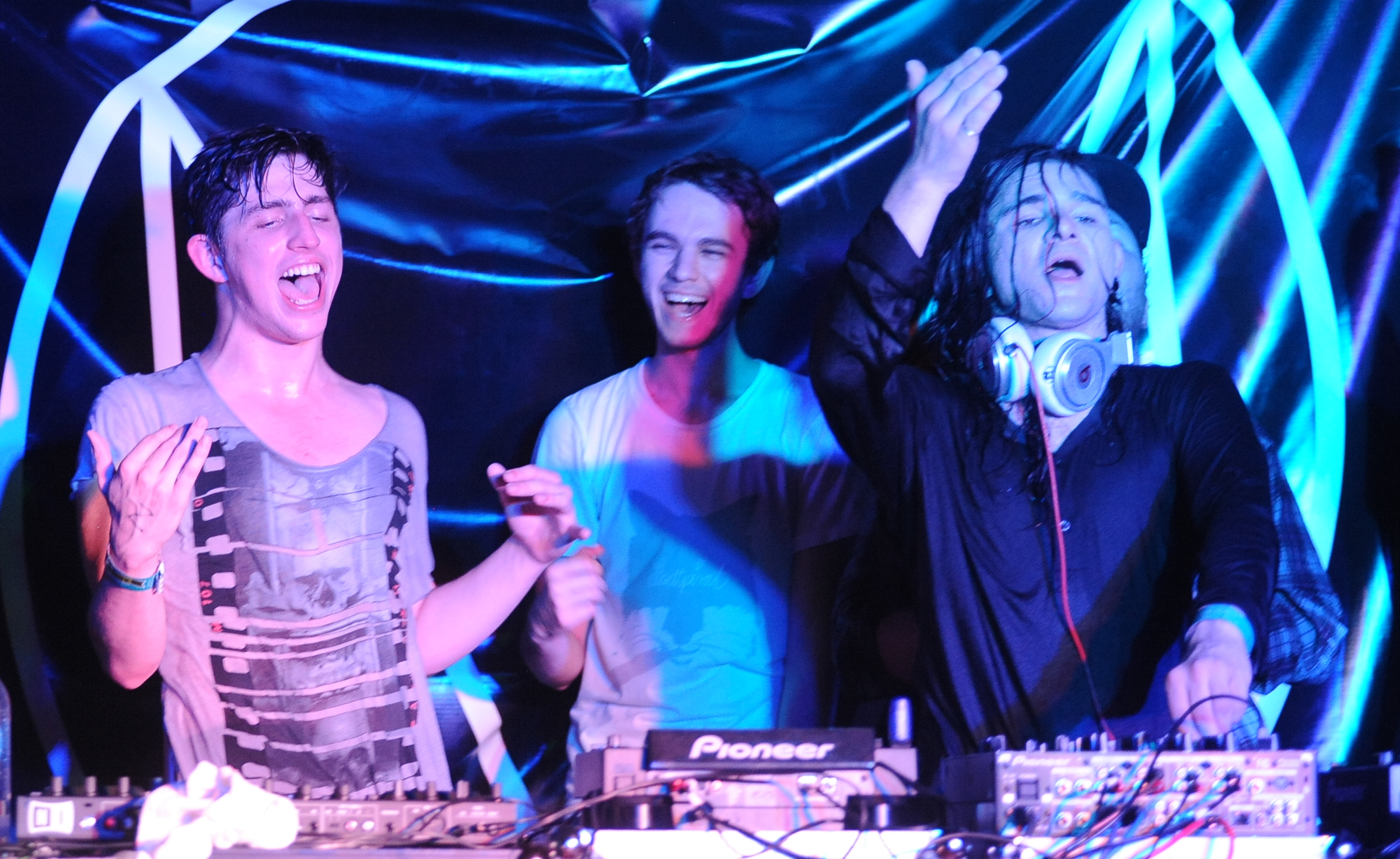
(L to R:) Porter Robinson, Zedd, and Skrillex performing at SXSW in March 2012

Moore kicked off the "Project Blue Book Tour" in 2011 with support from Porter Robinson, Tommy Lee and DJ Aero as well as appearances from Sofia Toufa for a new song, "Bring Out the Devil". Skrillex unveiled several new songs on this tour including "First of the Year (Equinox)", "Reptile", and "Cinema" (remix of a Benny Benassi track). "Reptile" was featured in the TV commercial for Mortal Kombat 9, and "First of the Year (Equinox)" is featured on More Monsters and Sprites, his follow-up EP and remix companion to Scary Monsters and Nice Sprites. In April 2011, Spin premiered "Get Up", an exclusive new track from Korn that was produced by Skrillex. Korn made the track available for free download via their Facebook page. On April 15, 2011, KoRn joined Skrillex on stage for his set at Coachella 2011. On April 18, 2011, Sony Computer Entertainment (SCEA) development studio Naughty Dog released a trailer for the multiplayer component of their PlayStation 3 game Uncharted 3: Drake's Deception, featuring "Kill EVERYBODY" from Scary Monsters and Nice Sprites.

In June 2011, More Monsters and Sprites was released on Beatport, an EP consisting of three original tracks, including "First of the Year (Equinox)" and two versions of his original track "Ruffneck". The track "Ruffneck Bass" had been leaked on the internet months prior which used the same sample as in the new "Ruffneck" tracks on the EP. Skrillex released a music video for "Rock n' Roll (Will Take You to the Mountain)" on his official YouTube page on June 20, 2011. On August 17, 2011, he announced his label, Owsla. The label's first releases came from Bristol-based dubstep producers KOAN Sound, then-electro-house producer Porter Robinson from North Carolina, singer-songwriter Alvin Risk, and San Francisco-based M Machine.

On August 19, 2011, Skrillex released a music video for "First of the Year (Equinox)" via Spin.com. In late August 2011, it was announced that he would be appearing in Knife Party's first release, collaborating on "Zoology", a Moombahton style track. A preview was released on YouTube. In late September 2011, he created the track "Syndicate" as promotion for the video game of the same name. Kaskade's 2011 album Fire & Ice features "Lick It", a collaboration between Kaskade and Skrillex. The video for Skrillex's song "First of the Year (Equinox)" appears on the first episode of the Beavis and Butt-Head revival.

In August 2011, Skrillex gave a statement to RockSound Magazine that he would have an album released likely by September after a photoshoot for the cover and doing an extensive interview for them on his tour. On December 21, 2011, Skrillex unveiled the Bangarang EP for a Beatport release on December 23. On August 12, 2012, his new side-project formed with Boys Noize called Dog Blood released an EP called Next Order/Middle Finger. On November 6, 2012, Skrillex released a limited edition triple vinyl box set. Skrillex composed the song "Bug Hunt" for the 2012 animated film Wreck-It Ralph, as well as making a brief cameo as a DJ in the film's first act. In December 2012, "Make It Bun Dem," a ReggaeEDM track featuring Damian Marley, was used in as a looped variant during the single-player mission 'Kick the Hornets Nest' in the video game Far Cry 3. He composed the score for Spring Breakers with Cliff Martinez.

In 2012, Skrillex formed Dog Blood with Boys Noize. Their debut single, consisting of the songs "Next Order" and "Middle Finger", was released on August 12, 2012, on Beatport and iTunes. The song "Next Order" managed to top Beatport's Techno chart.

In 2013, Skrillex formed a duo with Diplo called Jack Ü. Jack Ü's debut performance took place at the Mad Decent Block Party in San Diego on September 15, 2013, which is a nationwide tour that record label Mad Decent puts together to showcase artists signed to the label. Diplo announced the project by releasing the Mad Decent Block Party lineup with Jack Ü playing at multiple stops on the tour. After some guessing by many of who Jack Ü was, Diplo finally came out to reveal that "Jack Ü ... means Skrillex and Diplo together".

=== 2014: Recess ===
Skrillex confirmed at a show in January 2013 that he would release a new LP in the summer. On January 2, 2013, he released his 7th EP, Leaving, on the OWSLA subscription service, Nest IV. He later released the single "Try It Out" with Alvin Risk.

On March 7, 2014, an app titled Alien Ride was put up on Apple's App Store, containing a secret folder with 11 hidden objects and a countdown ending March 10 at 6:30 p.m. EST. Moore's Web site was updated with the app's picture on the front page and it was later revealed that the folder contains Google Play and iTunes URLs, which eventually were revealed to be 11 new songs available to stream that comprised his debut LP, titled Recess. The album was made available for pre-order at midnight and was released on March 18, 2014.

=== 2016–2022: Collaborations and return to From First to Last ===
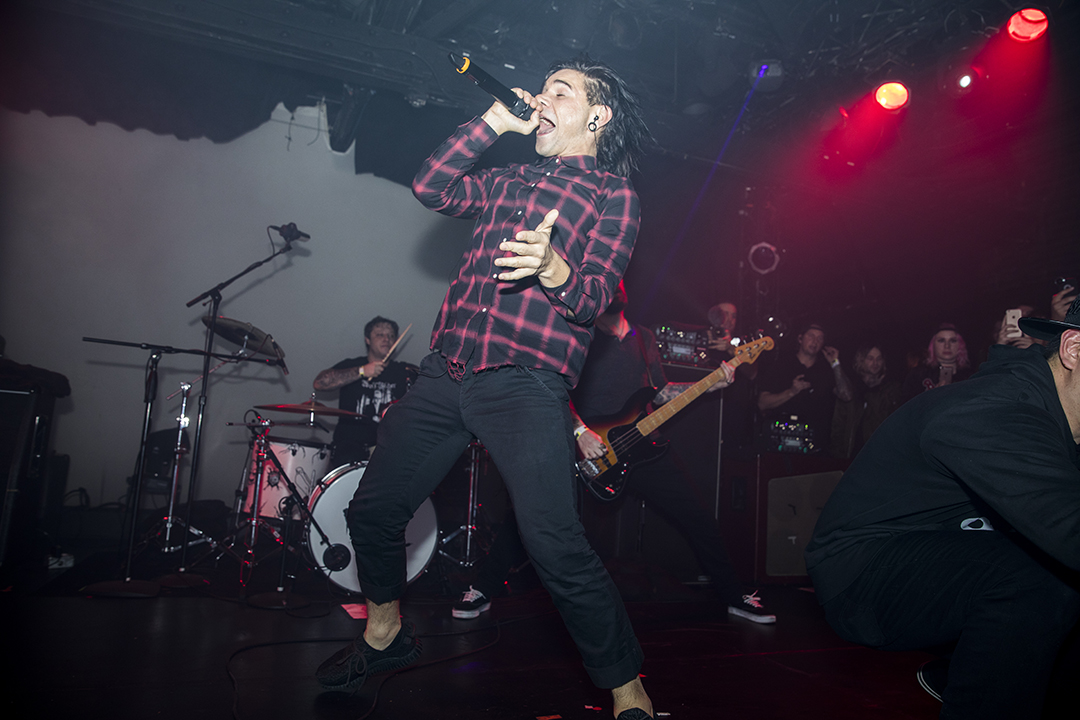
Skrillex performing with From First to Last at Emo Nite in 2017, his first show with the band in over ten years

In 2016, Skrillex collaborated with the K-pop girl group 4Minute. The first track, "Hate", was composed and arranged by Skrillex.

On January 15, 2017, Moore tweeted "Happy Birthday" with a link to a new From First to Last song which featured Moore on vocals. He later joined the band in Emo Nite LA for the first time in nearly a decade. In 2017, he released the songs "Chicken Soup" with Habstrakt, "Would You Ever" with Poo Bear, "Saint Laurent" with DJ Sliink and Wale and "Favor" with Vindata and NSTASIA.

In July 2018, Skrillex teased fans by collaborating with Missy Elliott on a snippet nicknamed "ID", released in 2023 as RATATA. On July 28, 2018, Skrillex collaborated with Japanese musician Yoshiki for performances of "Endless Rain" and "Scary Monsters And Nice Sprites" at Fuji Rock Festival in Niigata, Japan.

On October 8, 2018, Skrillex uploaded a photo to Twitter showcasing a collaboration between him and English DJ and producer Joyryde, later posting a video teaser of the song to Instagram. The collaboration, "Agen Wida", was officially released on October 19, 2018. On October 25, 2018, the single "Arms Around You", a collaboration between XXXTentacion and Lil Pump featuring Maluma and Swae Lee, was released; the song was produced by Skrillex alongside Mally Mall and JonFX.

Skrillex, Poo Bear, and Japanese-American singer Hikaru Utada collaborated on "Face My Fears", an opening song for the video game Kingdom Hearts III. The single was released on January 18, 2019.

On July 18, 2019, Skrillex released a two-track EP, Show Tracks, consisting of "Fuji Opener" featuring Alvin Risk and "Mumbai Power" featuring rapper Beam. Later that year, Skrillex made an appearance at The Warehouse Project in Manchester alongside Four Tet and Jon Hopkins.

On October 27, 2021, Skrillex performed his first solo set in the U.S. since the beginning of the pandemic at Avant Gardner in Brooklyn, New York. Throughout 2021 and 2022, Skrillex released various singles including "Butterflies", "In da Getto" and "Don't Go".

=== 2023: Quest for Fire and Don't Get Too Close ===
In January 2023, Moore posted a short video to social media teasing the release of his long-anticipated follow-up to his 2014 album, Recess. He subsequently announced that the lead single "Rumble", featuring Flowdan and Fred Again would be released on January 4.

On February 13, 2023, Skrillex released the single "Don't Get Too Close". He is separately credited as "Sonny Moore" on the title track of his second 2023 album, and is featured as a vocalist for the first time since 2015's Skrillex and Diplo Present Jack Ü.

On February 17, 2023, Skrillex released his second album, Quest For Fire, featuring a mix of pre-released singles and new songs, containing a range of genres with artists such as Flowdan, Porter Robinson and Fred Again credited. Critical reception was generally positive, with Ben Jolley for NME writing that "[Skrillex's] return largely lives up to the hype" by "often channel[ing] nostalgia", yet also commenting that "the album lacks a clear narrative or overarching theme".

On February 18, 2023, while performing at a sold out Madison Square Garden venue with Four Tet and Fred Again, Skrillex released his third studio album, Don't Get Too Close, less than two days after the release of Quest For Fire. On April 19, Skrillex posted a tweet teasing two further albums for release in 2023: Contra and Skrlx.

=== 2024–present: Ninth Grammy Award and collaborations ===
In February 2024, Skrillex won his ninth Grammy Award for the collaborative single "Rumble". In March 2024, Moore, Ahadadream and Priya Ragu released the track "Taka" (stylized as TAKA), which fuses gqom, UK funky, and R&B elements within a South Asian-influenced framework. The song was initially developed during the pandemic. "Taka" drew inspiration from South Asian heritage and portrayed a vivid celebration of South Asian culture. In May 2024, Skrillex, Taichu and Hamdi collaborated on the single "Push".

On April 1, 2025, Skrillex released an album mix titled "FUS" to email subscribers through a Dropbox link. Later the same day the album was released to streaming services as Fuck U Skrillex You Think Ur Andy Warhol but Ur Not!! <3. Following the release of the album, tickets for his May show at Red Rocks were sold out within minutes, leading him to address the problem of ticket scalping on the social media platform X.

On January 30, 2026, Skrillex collaborated with artists Dylan Brady and Xaviersobased on the song "Party At My Place", the bonus track to the latter's debut album Xavier.

== Influences ==
Moore has cited Marilyn Manson, Nine Inch Nails, and the Doors as early influences for his music. Moore stated in an online interview that he is a longtime fan of Warp, a label whose roster includes notable electronic artists such as Aphex Twin and Squarepusher. In an interview for Daft Punk Unchained, a 2015 documentary about the French electronic music duo Daft Punk, Moore said he was first exposed to electronic dance music after attending the duo's highly praised 2006 Coachella set.

== Personal life ==
Moore dated English singer-songwriter Ellie Goulding throughout 2012.

In a 2015 interview, Moore stated that although his parents practiced Scientology, he does not. He explained that music consumes most of the time he could theoretically devote to religion.

In a series of tweets in January 2023, Skrillex shared his struggles with mental health, revealing the reason behind the cancellation of his appearances at Movement Detroit and Tampa's Sunset Music Festival: "[I have] had the toughest year of my life in 2022, as did so many others. I literally found myself with no drive and purpose for the first time in my life." He noted that his mother's death in 2015 made him turn to alcohol: "I drank the pain away and kept going"; "2022 was sort of my tipping point."

== Discography ==
=== Studio albums ===
- Recess (2014)
- Quest for Fire (2023)
- Don't Get Too Close (2023)
- Fuck U Skrillex You Think Ur Andy Warhol but Ur Not!! <3 (2025)
- Soma (2026)

=== With Jack Ü ===
- Jack Ü (2015)

=== With From First to Last (as Sonny Moore) ===
- Dear Diary, My Teen Angst Has a Bodycount (2004)
- Heroine (2006)

== Filmography ==
- Let's Make a Spaceship (2014)

Moore partnered with Red Bull to produce a documentary titled Let's Make a Spaceship. It premiered on October 11, 2014, at 10 p.m. CT at the ACL Festival after his headline performance. His performance and documentary, and others' performances, are available for stream at Red Bull TV's website.

== Awards and nominations ==
List of awards and nominations received by Skrillex
| Award | Year | Nominee(s) | Category | Result | Ref. |
|---|---|---|---|---|---|
| Annie Awards | 2013 | Wreck-It Ralph | Outstanding Achievement, Music in an Animated Feature Production | Won | |
| Berlin Music Video Awards | 2016 | "Red Lips" feat. Sam Bruno (Skrillex Remix) | Best Editor | Nominated | |
| Berlin Music Video Awards | 2022 | "Butterflies" | Best Performer | Won | |
| Berlin Music Video Awards | 2024 | Pepper (with Flowdan, Lil Baby) | Best Cinematography | Nominated | |
| Electronic Music Awards | 2017 | "Purple Lamborghini" (with Rick Ross) | Single of the Year | Nominated | |
| Grammy Awards | 2012 | Skrillex | Best New Artist | Nominated | |
| Grammy Awards | 2012 | "Scary Monsters and Nice Sprites" | Best Dance Recording | Won | |
| Grammy Awards | 2012 | Scary Monsters and Nice Sprites | Best Dance/Electronica Album | Won | |
| Grammy Awards | 2012 | Benny Benassi featuring Gary Go – "Cinema (Skrillex Remix)" | Best Remixed Recording, Non-Classical | Won | |
| Grammy Awards | 2012 | "First of the Year (Equinox)" | Best Short Form Music Video | Nominated | |
| Grammy Awards | 2013 | "Bangarang" | Best Dance Recording | Won | |
| Grammy Awards | 2013 | Bangarang | Best Dance/Electronica Album | Won | |
| Grammy Awards | 2013 | "Promises" (Skrillex & Nero Remix) | Best Remixed Recording, Non-Classical | Won | |
| Grammy Awards | 2016 | "Where Are Ü Now" (with Diplo and Justin Bieber) | Best Dance Recording | Won | |
| Grammy Awards | 2016 | Skrillex and Diplo Present Jack Ü (with Diplo) | Best Dance/Electronic Album | Won | |
| Grammy Awards | 2017 | Purpose (as a featured artist, producer & engineer) | Album of the Year | Nominated | |
| Grammy Awards | 2017 | "Purple Lamborghini" (with Rick Ross & Beat Billionaire) | Best Song Written for Visual Media | Nominated | |
| Grammy Awards | 2020 | "Midnight Hour" (with Ty Dolla Sign & Boys Noize) | Best Dance Recording | Nominated | |
| Grammy Awards | 2022 | "Justice (Triple Chucks Deluxe)" | Album of the Year | Nominated | |
| Grammy Awards | 2023 | "Renaissance" | Album of the Year | Nominated | |
| Grammy Awards | 2024 | "Rumble" | Best Dance/Electronic Recording | Won | |
| Grammy Awards | 2024 | Quest for Fire | Best Dance/Electronic Album | Nominated | |
| Grammy Awards | 2025 | "Leavemealone" (with Baby Keem) | Best Dance/Electronic Recording | Nominated | |
| Grammy Awards | 2026 | "Voltage" | Best Dance/Electronic Recording | Nominated | |
| Grammy Awards | 2026 | Fuck U Skrillex You Think Ur Andy Warhol but Ur Not!! | Best Dance/Electronic Album | Nominated | |
| Nickelodeon Kids' Choice Awards | 2017 | Skrillex | Favorite DJ/EDM Artist | Nominated | |
| MTV Iggy | 2011 | Skrillex | Best New Band in the World | Nominated | |
| MTV Video Music Awards | 2012 | "First of the Year (Equinox)" | Best Electronic Dance Music Video | Nominated | |
| MTV Video Music Awards | 2012 | "First of the Year (Equinox)" | Best Visual Effects | Won | |
| MTV Video Music Awards | 2013 | "Breakn' a Sweat" | Best Visual Effects | Nominated | |
| MTV Video Music Awards | 2015 | "Where Are Ü Now" (with Diplo featuring Justin Bieber) | Best Visual Effects | Won | |
| MTV Video Music Awards | 2015 | "Where Are Ü Now" (with Diplo featuring Justin Bieber) | Best Art Direction | Nominated | |
| MTV Video Music Awards | 2015 | "Where Are Ü Now" (with Diplo featuring Justin Bieber) | Best Editing | Nominated | |
| MTV Video Music Awards | 2015 | "Where Are Ü Now" (with Diplo featuring Justin Bieber) | Song of the Summer | Nominated | |
| MTV Video Music Awards | 2022 | In Da Getto (with J. Balvin) | Best Latin | Nominated | |
| Premio Lo Nuestro | 2022 | In Da Getto (with J. Balvin) | Crossover Collaboration of the Year | Won | |
| Premio Lo Nuestro | 2022 | In Da Getto (with J. Balvin) | Song of the Year - Urban Pop/Dance | Nominated | |
| Billboard Latin Music Awards | 2022 | Skrillex | Crossover Artist of the Year | Won | |

=== Listicles ===
Skrillex on selected listicles
| Publisher | Year | Listicle | Placement | Ref. |
|---|---|---|---|---|
| DJ Magazine | 2011 | Top 100 DJs | 19th | |
| DJ Magazine | 2012 | Top 100 DJs | 10th | |
| DJ Magazine | 2013 | Top 100 DJs | 11th | |
| DJ Magazine | 2014 | Top 100 DJs | 9th | |
| DJ Magazine | 2015 | Top 100 DJs | 9th | |
| DJ Magazine | 2016 | Top 100 DJs | 9th | |
| DJ Magazine | 2017 | Top 100 DJs | 16th | |
| DJ Magazine | 2018 | Top 100 DJs | 21st | |
| DJ Magazine | 2019 | Top 100 DJs | 21st | |
| DJ Magazine | 2020 | Top 100 DJs | 15th | |
| DJ Magazine | 2021 | Top 100 DJs | 24th | |
| DJ Magazine | 2022 | Top 100 DJs | 23rd | |
| DJ Magazine | 2023 | Top 100 DJs | 17th | |
| DJ Magazine | 2024 | Top 100 DJs | 19th | |
| DJ Magazine | 2025 | Top 100 DJs | 31st | |

=== American Music Awards ===
| Year | Nominee / work | Award | Result |
|---|---|---|---|
| 2015 | "Where Are Ü Now" (with Justin Bieber) | Collaboration of the Year | Won |

=== Grammy Awards ===
| Year | Nominee / work | Award | Result |
|---|---|---|---|
| 2016 | Skrillex and Diplo Present Jack Ü | Best Dance/Electronic Album | Won |
| 2016 | "Where Are Ü Now" (with Justin Bieber) | Best Dance Recording | Won |
| 2027 | Soma | Best Dance/Electronic Album | Pending |

=== International Dance Music Awards ===
| Year | Nominee / work | Award | Result |
|---|---|---|---|
| 2016 | "Febreze" (with 2 Chainz) | Best Rap/Hip Hop/Trap Dance Track | Nominated |
| 2016 | "Where Are Ü Now" (with Justin Bieber) | Best Dubstep/Drum & Bass Track | Won |
| 2016 | "Where Are Ü Now" (with Justin Bieber) | Best Commercial/Pop Dance Track | Nominated |
| 2016 | "Where Are Ü Now" (with Justin Bieber) | Best Featured Vocalist Performance - Title, Vocalist/Artist | Nominated |
| 2016 | "Where Are Ü Now" (with Justin Bieber) | Best Music Video | Nominated |
| 2016 | Skrillex and Diplo Present Jack Ü | Best Dubstep/Drum & Bass DJ | Nominated |
| 2016 | Skrillex and Diplo Present Jack Ü | Best Artist (Group) | Nominated |

=== MTV Video Music Awards ===
| Year | Nominee / work | Award | Result |
|---|---|---|---|
| 2015 | "Where Are Ü Now" (with Justin Bieber) | Best Visual Effects | Won |
| 2015 | "Where Are Ü Now" (with Justin Bieber) | Best Art Direction | Nominated |
| 2015 | "Where Are Ü Now" (with Justin Bieber) | Best Editing | Nominated |
| 2015 | "Where Are Ü Now" (with Justin Bieber) | Song of the Summer | Nominated |

=== NRJ Music Awards ===
| Year | Awards | Category | Recipient | Outcome | Ref |
|---|---|---|---|---|---|
| 2016 | NRJ Music Awards | Best Collaboration of the Year | Skrillex & Diplo | Nominated | |

=== With From First to Last (as Sonny Moore) ===
| Year | Nominated work | Award | Result | Ref |
|---|---|---|---|---|
| 2006 | From First to Last | Alternative Press: Best International Newcomer | Nominated | |

== See also ==
- List of Billboard Social 50 number-one artists
