= Fred Again discography =

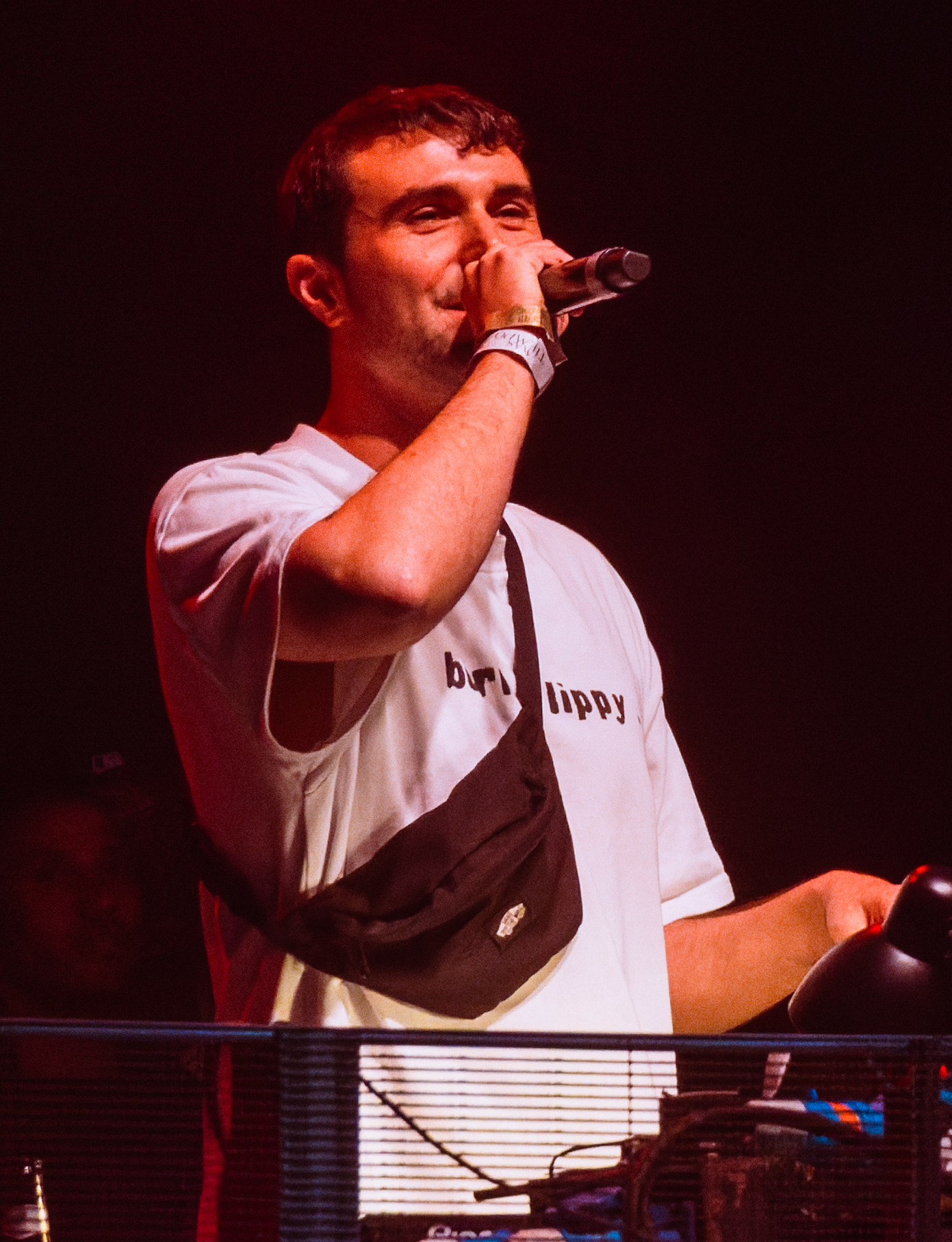
- Fred Again performing in 2025
- Studio albums: 4
- EPs: 3
- Compilation albums: 1
- Singles: 42

English record producer Fred Again has released four studio albums, two collaborative albums, one compilation album, three EPs, and 42 singles. His first album, Actual Life (April 14 – December 17 2020), was released in April 2021. His second album, Actual Life 2 (February 2 – October 15 2021), followed in November 2021. He achieved chart success with his third album, Actual Life 3 (January 1 – September 9 2022), released in October 2022, which reached the top 10 in the UK, Australia, Ireland and New Zealand.

== Albums ==
=== Studio albums ===
List of solo studio albums, with album details, selected chart positions and certifications
Title	Album details	Peak chart positions										Certifications
Title	Album details	UK	AUS	BEL (FL)	GER	IRE	LTU	NLD	NZ	SWE	SWI	Certifications
Actual Life (April 14 – December 17 2020)	Released: 16 April 2021; Label: Again.. Records, Atlantic; Formats: Digital download, streaming, vinyl	—	75	41	—	—	—	65	—	—	—	BPI: Silver; RMNZ: Gold
Actual Life 2 (February 2 – October 15 2021)	Released: 19 November 2021; Label: Atlantic; Formats: Digital download, streaming, vinyl	—	—	70	—	—	—	—	—	—	—	BPI: Silver
Actual Life 3 (January 1 – September 9 2022)	Released: 28 October 2022; Label: Atlantic; Formats: Digital download, streaming, CD, vinyl	4	8	10	27	2	29	11	6	48	40	BPI: Silver; RMNZ: Gold
Ten Days	Released: 6 September 2024; Label: Atlantic; Formats: Digital download, streaming, vinyl	7	3	3	12	11	23	11	5	18	4	BPI: Silver
"—" denotes a recording that did not chart or was not released.

=== Collaborative albums ===
List of collaborative studio albums, with selected chart positions
Title	Album details	Peak chart positions		
Title	Album details	AUS	BEL (FL)	NZ
Secret Life (with Brian Eno)	Released: 5 May 2023; Label: Text Records; Formats: Digital download, streaming, CD, vinyl	84	57	26

=== Compilation albums ===
List of compilation albums, with selected chart positions and certifications
Title	Details	Peak chart positions							Certifications
Title	Details	UK	AUS	BEL (FL)	GER	IRE	NLD	NZ	Certifications
USB	Released: Initial EP: 18 January 2022; USB001: 14 June 2024; USB002: 12 December 2025; Label: Atlantic Records UK; Formats: Vinyl, Digital download, streaming	29	4	8	12	23	11	3	BPI: Gold; RMNZ: Platinum; RMNZ: Gold (USB002)

== Mixtapes ==
List of mixtapes, with selected chart positions
Title	Album details	Peak chart positions
Title	Album details	UK
Gang (with Headie One)	Released: 3 April 2020; Label: Relentless; Formats: Digital download, streaming	49
9 Months & 50 Hours (with Latin Mafia)	Released: 31 July 2026; Label: Atlantic Records UK; Formats: Digital download, streaming	—

== Extended plays ==
List of EPs, with selected details
Title	Details	Peak chart positions	
Title	Details	UK	NZ
Actual Life	Released: 15 May 2020; Label: Again.. Records; Formats: Digital download, streaming	—	—
Two More Days	Released: 13 December 2024; Label: Atlantic; Formats: Digital download, streaming	—	—
Skepta .. Fred (with Skepta)	Released: 29 August 2025; Label: Epic; Formats: Digital download, streaming	72	26

== Singles ==
List of singles, with selected chart positions and certifications
Title	Year	Peak chart positions									Certifications	Album
Title	Year	UK	AUS	AUT	BEL (FL)	IRE	LTU	NLD	NZ	US Dance	Certifications	Album
"Julie (Stay)"	2019	—	—	—	—	—	—	—	—	—		Non-album single
"Kyle (I Found You)"	2019	—	—	—	—	—	—	—	—	—	BPI: Silver; RMNZ: Gold	Actual Life (April 14 – December 17 2020)
"Me (Sorry)"	2019	—	—	—	—	—	—	—	—	—		Actual Life
"Charades" (with Headie One)	2020	57	—	—	—	—	—	—	—	—		Gang
"Marnie (Wish I Had U)"	2020	—	—	—	—	—	—	—	—	—		Actual Life (April 14 – December 17 2020)
"Chika (Scared)"	2020	—	—	—	—	—	—	—	—	—		Actual Life
"Gang" (with Headie One)	2020	51	—	—	—	—	—	—	—	—		Gang
"Jessie (I Miss You)"	2020	—	—	—	—	—	—	—	—	—		Non-album single
"Julia (Deep Diving)"	2020	—	—	—	—	—	—	—	—	—		Actual Life (April 14 – December 17 2020)
"Don't Judge Me" (with FKA Twigs and Headie One)	2021	—	—	—	—	—	—	—	—	23		Non-album single
"Marea (We've Lost Dancing)" (with The Blessed Madonna)	2021	36	—	—	12	41	30	11	—	33	BPI: Platinum; ARIA: Gold; IFPI AUT: Gold; MC: Platinum; NVPI: Platinum; RMNZ: Platinum	Actual Life (April 14 – December 17 2020)
"Stay High Again.." (with Brittany Howard and Joy Anonymous)	2021	—	—	—	—	—	—	—	—	—		Non-album single
"Dermot (See Yourself in My Eyes)"	2021	—	—	—	—	—	—	—	—	—	BPI: Silver; RMNZ: Gold	Actual Life (April 14 – December 17 2020)
"Angie (I've Been Lost)"	2021	—	—	—	—	—	—	—	—	—		Actual Life (April 14 – December 17 2020)
"Diana (You Don't Even Know)"	2021	—	—	—	—	—	—	—	—	—		DJ-Kicks: Jayda G
"Baxter (These Are My Friends)" (with Baxter Dury)	2021	—	—	—	—	—	—	—	—	—		Actual Life 3 (January 1 – September 9 2022)
"Billie (Loving Arms)"	2021	—	—	—	—	46	—	—	—	—	BPI: Silver; RMNZ: Gold	Actual Life 2 (February 2 – October 15 2021)
"Hannah (The Sun)"	2021	—	—	—	—	—	—	—	—	—		Actual Life 2 (February 2 – October 15 2021)
"Faisal (Envelops Me)"	2021	—	—	—	—	—	—	—	—	—		Actual Life 2 (February 2 – October 15 2021)
"Lights Out" (with Romy and HAAi)	2022	—	—	—	—	—	—	—	— (Note: "Lights Out" did not enter the NZ Top 40 Singles Chart, but peaked at number 32 on the NZ Hot 40 Singles Chart.)	35		USB
"Admit It (U Don't Want 2)" (with I. Jordan)	2022	—	—	—	—	—	—	—	—	50		USB
"Jungle"	2022	78	52	—	—	61	56	—	33	28	BPI: Gold; ARIA: Gold; MC: Platinum; RMNZ: 2× Platinum	USB
"Turn On the Lights Again.." (with Swedish House Mafia featuring Future)	2022	27	71	—	—	23	76	— (Note: "Turn on the Lights Again.." did not enter the Single Top 100, but peaked at No. 11 on the Single Tip chart.)	— (Note: "Turn On the Lights Again.." did not enter the NZ Top 40 Singles Chart, but peaked at number nine on the NZ Hot 40 Singles Chart.)	16	BPI: Platinum; ARIA: Gold; MC: Platinum; RMNZ: Platinum	USB
"Danielle (Smile on My Face)"	2022	61	—	—	—	41	—	—	— (Note: "Danielle (Smile on My Face)" did not enter the NZ Top 40 Singles Chart, but peaked at number 14 on the NZ Hot 40 Singles Chart.)	45	BPI: Silver; RMNZ: Gold	Actual Life 3 (January 1 – September 9 2022)
"Bleu (Better with Time)"	2022	—	—	—	—	—	—	—	— (Note: "Bleu (Better with Time)" did not enter the NZ Top 40 Singles Chart, but peaked at number 20 on the NZ Hot 40 Singles Chart.)	30		Actual Life 3 (January 1 – September 9 2022)
"Kammy (Like I Do)"	2022	—	—	—	—	—	—	—	—	45		Actual Life 3 (January 1 – September 9 2022)
"Delilah (Pull Me Out of This)"	2022	35	25	—	—	8	—	— (Note: "Delilah (Pull Me Out of This)" did not enter the Single Top 100, but peaked at No. 23 on the Single Tip chart.)	11	23	BPI: Platinum; ARIA: Gold; MC: Platinum; RMNZ: Platinum	Actual Life 3 (January 1 – September 9 2022)
"Clara (The Night Is Dark)"	2022	62	—	—	—	43	—	—	— (Note: "Clara (The Night Is Dark)" did not enter the NZ Top 40 Singles Chart, but peaked at number six on the NZ Hot 40 Singles Chart.)	18		Actual Life 3 (January 1 – September 9 2022)
"Strong" (with Romy)	2022	—	—	—	—	—	—	—	— (Note: "Strong" did not enter the NZ Top 40 Singles Chart, but peaked at number 28 on the NZ Hot 40 Singles Chart.)	27		Mid Air
"Rumble" (with Skrillex and Flowdan)	2023	19	32	—	—	29	66	—	21	10	BPI: Silver; MC: Gold; RMNZ: 2× Platinum	Quest for Fire, USB
"Mike (Desert Island Duvet)" (with The Streets and Dermot Kennedy)	2023	78	—	—	—	44	—	—	— (Note: "Mike (Desert Island Duvet)" did not enter the NZ Top 40 Singles Chart, but peaked at number 11 on the NZ Hot 40 Singles Chart.)	30		Fabric Presents The Streets
"Baby Again.." (with Skrillex and Four Tet)	2023	52	70	—	—	44	—	— (Note: "Baby Again.." did not enter the Single Top 100, but peaked at No. 28 on the Single Tip chart.)	— (Note: "Baby Again.." did not enter the NZ Top 40 Singles Chart, but peaked at number three on the NZ Hot 40 Singles Chart.)	11	BPI: Silver; RMNZ: Gold	USB
"Adore U" (with Obongjayar)	2023	4	41	—	45	1	—	80	22	16	BPI: Platinum; ARIA: Platinum; MC: Gold; RMNZ: Platinum	Ten Days
"Ten" (with Jozzy)	2023	16	89	—	—	13	—	— (Note: "Ten" did not enter the Dutch Single Top 100, but peaked at number four on the Single Tip chart.)	— (Note: "Ten" did not enter the NZ Top 40 Singles Chart, but peaked at number two on the NZ Hot 40 Singles Chart.)	17	BPI: Silver; MC: Gold; RMNZ: Platinum	Ten Days
"Leavemealone" (with Baby Keem)	2023	11	13	57	—	21	51	— (Note: "Leave Me Alone" did not enter the Dutch Single Top 100, but peaked at number four on the Single Tip chart.)	4	6	BPI: Platinum; ARIA: Platinum; BRMA: Gold; MC: Gold; RMNZ: 3× Platinum	USB
"Stayinit" (with Lil Yachty and Overmono)	2024	53	53	—	—	57	—	—	35	12	RMNZ: Gold	USB
"Places to Be" (with Anderson .Paak and Chika)	2024	35	51	—	—	43	—	—	27	10	BPI: Silver; ARIA: Platinum; MC: Gold; RMNZ: Platinum	Ten Days
"Light Dark Light" (with Angie McMahon)	2024	—	—	—	—	—	—	—	—	15		Two More Days
"Victory Lap" (with PlaqueBoyMax and Skepta)	2025	4	3	—	—	14	—	—	2	4	BPI: Platinum; ARIA: 2× Platinum; RMNZ: 2× Platinum	USB (re-issue)
"Air Maxes" (with Kettama and Shady Nasty)	2025	—	—	—	—	—	—	—	— (Note: "Air Maxes" did not enter the NZ Top 40 Singles Chart, but peaked at number 13 on the NZ Hot 40 Singles Chart.)	—		Archangel
"You're a Star" (with Amyl and the Sniffers)	2025	47	—	—	—	—	—	—	— (Note: "You're a Star" did not enter the NZ Top 40 Singles Chart, but peaked at number 5 on the NZ Hot 40 Singles Chart.)	7		USB (re-issue)
"Hardstyle 2" (with Kettama and Shady Nasty)	2025	—	—	—	—	58	—	—	— (Note: "Hardstyle 2" did not enter the NZ Top 40 Singles Chart, but peaked at number 1 on the NZ Hot 40 Singles Chart.)	24		USB (re-issue)
"Talk of the Town" (with Sammy Virji and Reggie)	2025	18	47	—	—	4	—	—	36	18	BPI: Silver; ARIA: Gold; RMNZ: Gold	USB (re-issue)
"Beto's Horns" (Fred remix) (with Ca7riel & Paco Amoroso)	2025	—	—	—	—	85	—	—	— (Note: "Beto's Horns" (Fred remix) did not enter the NZ Top 40 Singles Chart, but peaked at number 7 on the NZ Hot 40 Singles Chart.)	15		USB (re-issue)
"Winny" (with Sammy Virji and Winny)	2025	—	—	—	—	—	—	—	— (Note: "Winny" did not enter the NZ Top 40 Singles Chart, but peaked at number 7 on the NZ Hot 40 Singles Chart.)	14		USB (re-issue)
"Icey" (with Bia)	2025	—	—	—	—	—	—	—	— (Note: "Icey" did not enter the NZ Top 40 Singles Chart, but peaked at number 11 on the NZ Hot 40 Singles Chart.)	—		USB (re-issue)
"Feisty" (with Bia)	2025	—	—	—	—	—	—	—	— (Note: "Feisty" did not enter the NZ Top 40 Singles Chart, but peaked at number 2 on the NZ Hot 40 Singles Chart.)	—		USB (re-issue)
"Solo" (with Blanco)	2025	—	—	—	—	—	—	—	— (Note: "Solo" did not enter the NZ Top 40 Singles Chart, but peaked at number 5 on the NZ Hot 40 Singles Chart.)	23		USB (re-issue)
"I Luv U" (with Wallfacer)	2025	—	—	—	—	—	—	—	—	18		USB (re-issue)
"Scared" (with Young Thug)	2026	55	—	—	—	78	—	—	—	8		USB (re-issue)
"Lights Burn Dimmer" (with Jamie T)	2026	49	—	—	—	56	—	—	— (Note: "Lights Burn Dimmer" did not enter the NZ Top 40 Singles Chart, but peaked at number 11 on the Hot 40 Singles Chart.)	11		USB (re-issue)
"Te Estoy Correteando" (with Latin Mafia)	2026	—	—	—	—	—	—	—	—	3		9 Months & 50 Hours
"Sexy Magic" (Ca7riel & Paco Amoroso with PinkPantheress, Fred Again, and Étienne de Crécy)	2026	87	—	—	—	—	—	—	—	8		Grand Theft Auto VI: The Album
"—" denotes a recording that did not chart or was not released.

== Other charted songs ==
List of other charted songs, with selected chart positions
Title	Year	Peak chart positions				Album
Title	Year	UK	IRE	NZ Hot	US Dance	Album
"Eyelar (Shutters)"	2022	—	—	13	—	Actual Life 3 (January 1 – September 9 2022)
"Kelly (End of a Nightmare)"	2022	—	—	17	—	Actual Life 3 (January 1 – September 9 2022)
"I Saw You" (with Brian Eno)	2023	—	—	28	—	Secret Life
"Secret" (with Brian Eno)	2023	—	—	39	—	Secret Life
"Enough" (with Brian Eno)	2023	—	—	20	—	Secret Life
"BerwynGesaffNeighbours" (with Berwyn and Gesaffelstein)	2024	—	—	32	—	USB
"Fear Less" (with Sampha)	2024	—	—	6	29	Ten Days
"Just Stand There" (with Soak)	2024	57	56	3	17	Ten Days
"Glow" (with Duskus, Four Tet and Skrillex)	2024	88	—	7	27	Ten Days
"Peace U Need" (with Joy Anonymous)	2024	64	—	4	37	Ten Days
"Backseat" (with the Japanese House and Scott Hardkiss)	2024	—	—	—	40	Ten Days
"Back 2 Back" (with Skepta)	2025	54	—	5	—	Skepta .. Fred
"London" (with Skepta)	2025	70	—	8	—	Skepta .. Fred
"Last 1s Left" (with Skepta)	2025	—	—	11	—	Skepta .. Fred
"21 Years" (with Skepta)	2025	—	—	12	—	Skepta .. Fred
"OK OK" (with Danny Brown, Beam, JPEGMAFIA and Parisi)	2025	—	—	6	25	USB
"Alvafro" (with Latin Mafia)	2026	—	—	—	19	9 Months & 50 Hours
"Quiereme" (with Latin Mafia and Bby)	2026	—	—	—	25	9 Months & 50 Hours
"—" denotes recording did not chart in that territory.

== Additional credits ==
Fred has a lengthy discography, with regular releases since 2014. The discography tables below chronicle some of them.

=== 2014–2016 ===
Year	Artist	Title	Album
2014	Eno • Hyde	"Titian Bekh"	Someday World
2014	Eno • Hyde	"Celebration"	Someday World
2014	Eno • Hyde	"Brazil 3"	Someday World
2014	Eno • Hyde	"Big Band Sound"	Someday World
2014	Eno • Hyde	"To Us All"	Someday World
2014	Eno • Hyde	"When I Built This World"	Someday World
2014	Eno • Hyde	"Who Rings the Bell"	Someday World
2014	Eno • Hyde	"Mother of a Dog"	Someday World
2014	Eno • Hyde	"Strip It Down"	Someday World
2014	Eno • Hyde	"Witness"	Someday World
2014	Eno • Hyde	"A Man Wakes Up"	Someday World
2014	Eno • Hyde	"Daddy's Car"	Someday World
2014	Eno • Hyde	"The Satellites"	Someday World
2014	Eno • Hyde	"Cells & Bells"	High Life
2014	Eno • Hyde	"On a Grey Day"	High Life
2014	Eno • Hyde	"Time to Waste IT"	High Life
2014	Eno • Hyde	"DBF"	High Life
2014	Eno • Hyde	"Moulded Life"	High Life
2014	Eno • Hyde	"Lilac"	High Life
2014	Eno • Hyde	"Slow Down, Sit Down & Breathe"	High Life
2014	Eno • Hyde	"Return"	High Life
2015	Roots Manuva	"Hard Bastards"	Bleeds
2015	Roots Manuva	"Don't Breathe Out"	Bleeds
2015	Roots Manuva	"Cargo"	Bleeds
2015	Roots Manuva	"Stepping Hard"	Bleeds
2015	Roots Manuva	"Me Up!"	Bleeds
2015	Roots Manuva	"I Know Your Face"	Bleeds
2015	Roots Manuva	"Fighting For?"	Bleeds
2015	Roots Manuva	"Knee Jerk"	Bleeds
2015	Ellie Goulding	"Around U"	Delirium
2015	Ellie Goulding	"We Can't Move to This"	Delirium
2016	Charli XCX feat. Lil Yachty	"After the Afterparty"	Non-album singles
2016	M.O feat. Kent Jones	"Not in Love"	Non-album singles
2016	M.O	"Who Do You Think Of?"	Who Do You Think Of? EP
2016	Stefflon Don	"Dem Neva Warn Ya"	Real Ting
2016	Stefflon Don	"16 Shots"	Real Ting

=== 2017–2019 ===
Year	Artist	Title	Album
2017	Abra Cadabra feat. Burna Boy and Jelani Blackman	"Lemme At Em"	Non-album single
2017	Little Mix	"Is Your Love Enough?"	Glory Days: The Platinum Edition
2017	Jax Jones feat. Ina Wroldsen	"Breathe"	Snacks EP
2018	Maisie Peters	"In My Head"	Dressed Too Nice for a Jacket
2018	Maisie Peters	"Worst of You"	Non-album single
2018	Mr Eazi and Chronixx	"She Loves Me"	Life Is Eazi, Vol. 2 – Lagos to London
2018	Mr Eazi feat. Mo-T	"Property"	Life Is Eazi, Vol. 2 – Lagos to London
2018	Mr Eazi	"Yard & Chill"	Life Is Eazi, Vol. 2 – Lagos to London
2018	Shawn Mendes	"Fallin' All in You"	Shawn Mendes
2018	Ray BLK	"Run Run"	Empress
2018	Burna Boy feat. Lily Allen	"Heaven's Gate"	Outside
2018	Plan B	"Wait So Long"	Heaven Before All Hell Breaks Loose
2018	Plan B	"Guess Again"	Heaven Before All Hell Breaks Loose
2018	George Ezra	"Shotgun"	Staying at Tamara's
2018	Clean Bandit feat. Demi Lovato	"Solo"	What Is Love?
2018	Rita Ora	"Let You Love Me"	Phoenix
2018	Jess Glynne	"Rollin"	Always in Between
2018	Octavian	"Stand Down"	Spaceman
2019	Westlife	"Better Man"	Spectrum
2019	Ellie Goulding	"Sixteen"	Brightest Blue
2019	BTS	"Make It Right"	Map of the Soul: Persona
2019	Ed Sheeran and Justin Bieber	"I Don't Care"	No.6 Collaborations Project
2019	Ed Sheeran feat. Chance the Rapper and PnB Rock	"Cross Me"	No.6 Collaborations Project
2019	Ed Sheeran feat. Khalid	"Beautiful People"	No.6 Collaborations Project
2019	Ed Sheeran and Travis Scott	"Antisocial"	No.6 Collaborations Project
2019	Ed Sheeran feat. Camila Cabello and Cardi B	"South of the Border"	No.6 Collaborations Project
2019	Ed Sheeran feat. Stormzy	"Take Me Back to London"	No.6 Collaborations Project
2019	Ed Sheeran feat. Eminem and 50 Cent	"Remember the Name"	No.6 Collaborations Project
2019	Ed Sheeran feat. Young Thug and J Hus	"Feels"	No.6 Collaborations Project
2019	Ed Sheeran feat. Ella Mai	"Put It All on Me"	No.6 Collaborations Project
2019	Ed Sheeran feat. Paulo Londra and Dave	Nothing on You	No.6 Collaborations Project
2019	Ed Sheeran feat. Meek Mill and A Boogie wit da Hoodie	"1000 Nights"	No.6 Collaborations Project
2019	Maisie Peters	"Adore You"	It's Your Bed Babe, It's Your Funeral
2019	Mist feat. Fredo	"So High"	Non-album single
2019	Stormzy	"Big Michael"	Heavy Is The Head
2019	Stormzy feat. Aitch	"Pop Boy"	Heavy Is The Head
2019	Stormzy feat. Ed Sheeran & Burna Boy	"Own It"	Heavy Is The Head

=== 2020–present ===
Year	Artist	Title	Album
2020	Eminem feat. Ed Sheeran	"Those Kinda Nights"	Music to Be Murdered By
2020	Jayda G	"Both Of Us"	Non-album-Single
2020	AJ Tracey and Mabel	"West Ten"	Flu Game / High Expectations
2020	Ed Sheeran	"Afterglow"	Non-album Single
2020	Romy	"Lifetime"	Non-album Single
2021	Ed Sheeran	Bad Habits	=
2021	Ed Sheeran	"Shivers"	=
2021	Ed Sheeran	"Overpass Graffiti"	=
2021	Ed Sheeran	"The Joker and the Queen"	=
2021	Ed Sheeran	"First Times"	=
2021	Ed Sheeran	"Collide"	=
2021	Ed Sheeran	"Stop the Rain"	=
2021	Ed Sheeran	"Love in Slow Motion"	=
2021	Ed Sheeran	"Be Right Now"	=
2021	Maisie Peters	"Elvis Song"	You Signed Up for This
2022	Aitch and Ashanti	"Baby"	Close to Home
2022	Swedish House Mafia	"Calling On"	Paradise Again
2023	P!nk	"Trustfall"	Trustfall
2023	Ed Sheeran	"F64"	Non-album Single
2023	Sam Smith ft. Ed Sheeran	"Who We Love"	Gloria
2023	Skrillex, Boys Noize	"Fine Day Anthem"	Non-album Single
2024	Parisi	"High for This"	Non-album Single
2024	¥$	"Slide"	Vultures 2
