= Jay Reynolds =

British record engineer

- Born: England
- Occupations: Recording engineer, record producer, mixing engineer, songwriter

Jay Reynolds is a 2 x Grammy award-winning mixer, record producer, songwriter and musician. He has produced and mixed albums/singles for Dua Lipa, Fred Again, Bob Moses, Khalid, Headie One, Just Jack, Pixie Lott, Paloma Faith, The Vamps, Nines, AJ Tracey, James Blunt, Aitch, Tom Walker, Griff, Liam Gallagher, Rudimental, Ella Henderson, Swedish House Mafia, Clementine Douglas and Stormzy.

Having mixed the title track to Berwyn - Who Am I The Album won Best Album at the 2025 Ivor Novello awards.

== Mix London ==
Currently Jay has 3 mixing rooms at Mix London, Shepherd's Bush, London. He has a fully certified Dolby Atmos mixing room using a Genelec 7.2.4 speaker system.

He is represented by JAX Management.

== Selected mixing credits ==
=== 2020s ===
- 2025: Forever | Zulan
- 2025: In My Room | Badger & Julia Wolf
- 2025: Time Of Your Life | Bob Moses
- 2025: The Way I'm Wired | RuthAnne
- 2025: All I Know | Rudimental & Khalid
- 2025: Makaelo (Origins) Ep | KILIMANJARO
- 2024: Gravity | Loreen
- 2024: Afrikan Alien Album | Pa Salieu - Ivor Novello Nominated 2025
- 2024: WHOSDAT Ep | JayO
- 2024: Quit While You're Ahead | Nines
- 2024: Body Type | Badger & Icona Pop
- 2024: Edge Of A Saturday Night | The Blessed Madonna & Kylie Minogue
- 2024: WHO AM I | Berwyn - Ivor Novello Winner 2025
- 2024: Where Did You Go? | Griff
- 2024: Forever | Loreen
- 2024: Maybe | BUNT. & GRAHAM
- 2024: These Words | Badger & Natasha Bedingfield
- 2024: No Hard Feelings EP | Leigh-Anne
- 2024: You’re Not Alone | Punctual & RY X
- 2024: Green & Gold | Rudimental, Charlotte Plank & Riko Dan
- 2024: Happier | The Blessed Madonna & Clementine Douglas
- 2024: Waterslides | Tiesto Rudimental & ABsolutely
- 2023: Peace In The Silence | BUNT.
- 2023: The Weekend | Stormzy & Raye
- 2023: Leavemealone (ft. Baby Keem) | Fred Again
- 2023: Dancing Is Healing | Rudimental
- 2023: Oh My (ft. Moby) | Luude & Issey Cross
- 2023: Mama’s Eyes | Mette
- 2023: Actual Life 3 | Fred Again - Grammy Winner 2023
- 2023: Bulletproof | Berwyn
- 2023: Hold On To My Love | John Newman
- 2023: Blood Orange | Freya Ridings
- 2023: Crop Circle 3 Album | Nines
- 2023: Crop Circle 2 Album | Nines
- 2023: Time Will Fly / See Me | Sam Tompkins
- 2023: Die Young | Venbee & Rudimental
- 2022: Baby | Aitch & Ashanti
- 2022: Everything I Didn’t Say | Ella Henderson
- 2022: Big City Life | Luude & Mattafix
- 2022: Blonde | Maisie Peters
- 2022: Time / Calling On | Swedish House Mafia
- 2022: Something on My Mind | Super Shy
- 2022: Jungle | Fred Again
- 2022: Admit It (ft. I Jordan) | Fred Again
- 2022: Lights Out (ft. Romy & HAAi) | Fred Again
- 2022: 22 Make Album| Oh Wonder
- 2022: Messy In Heaven | Venbee & Goddard.
- 2022: Don’t Leave Me Lonely | Clean Bandit
- 2022: Path To Satisfaction | Berwyn
- 2022: Serotonin Moonbeams / Mercy ft. Jacob Lusk | The Blessed Madonna
- 2021: Let’s Just Say.. | Honne
- 2021: Actual Life 2 | Fred Again
- 2021: Wild Dreams | Westlife
- 2021: Rollin’ (ft. Burna Boy) | Mist
- 2021: Girls Like Sex / Priorities / Die On The Dancefloor | L Devine
- 2021: Actual Life | Fred Again
- 2021: Love Under Pressure / Unstoppable / Adrenaline / I Came For Love | James Blunt
- 2021: Lit / Glidin’ ft. Slowthai / Bad ft. Aitch | Pa Salieu
- 2021: The Greatest Hits (Part 1) | Kurupt FM
- 2021: Talk About | Rain Radio & DJ Craig Gorman
- 2021: Heart Of Gold / Remembering My Dreams | Griff
- 2021: Rubber Bands / MIA | Berwyn
- 2020: Ain’t It Different | Headie One, AJ Tracey & Stormzy
- 2020: Send Them To Coventy | Pa Salieu
- 2020: Wait For You (ft. Zoe Wees) | Tom Walker
- 2020: West Ten | AJ Tracey & Mabel
- 2020: Boys Will Be Boys | Dua Lipa - Grammy Winner 2020
- 2020: Gang | Headie One & Fred Again
- 2020: Princess Cuts (ft. Young T & Bugsey) | Headie One
- 2020: Siberia (ft. Burna Boy) | Headie One
- 2020: Crabs In A Bucket | Nines
- 2020: Actual Life EP | Fred Again
- 2020: Secure The Bag! 2 | AJ Tracey
- 2020: Forgive Myself | Griff

=== 2010s ===
- 2019: So High (feat. Fredo) | Mist
- 2019: Savage / Different Strokes / Cemetery Walks | Mist
- 2019: Misunderstood | Liam Gallagher
- 2019: Gaia & Friends | Crystal Fighters
- 2019: Misunderstood | Liam Gallagher
- 2018: Diamond In The Dirt | Mist
- 2018: Daughter | L Devine
- 2017: Garden | Dua Lipa
- 2016: Not Gonna Break Me | Jamie N Commons
- 2015: Wake Up | The Vamps
- 2014: Where Did the Love Go | Bipolar Sunshine
- 2014: Meet The Vamps | The Vamps
- 2014: Comeback | Ella Eyre
- 2014: Nasty | Pixie Lott

=== 2000s ===
- 2010: Broken Arrow | Pixie Lott
- 2010: The Illusion of Safety | The Hoosiers
- 2009: Upside Down | Paloma Faith - Additional Producer
- 2009: All Night Cinema | Just Jack - Produced & Mixed
- 2007: Starz in Their Eyes | Just Jack - Ivor Novello Nominated 2007
- 2007: Overtones | Just Jack Produced & Mixed
- 2005: Wonderland - Engineer | McFly
- 2004: Room on the 3rd Floor - Engineer | McFly
- 2003: Here's Tom with the Weather | Shack - Produced & Mixed
