= Actual Life =

Actual Life is a series of albums by Fred Again. It may refer to:

- Actual Life (EP), 2020
- Actual Life (April 14 – December 17 2020), 2021
- Actual Life 2 (February 2 – October 15 2021), 2021
- Actual Life 3 (January 1 – September 9 2022), 2022
