= Parisi (musicians) =

Italian music production & songwriting duo

- Origin: Salerno, Italy
- Genres: Pop; dance-pop; house; hip-hop
- Occupations: Multi-instrumentalists; producers; remixers; sound designers; songwriters
- Years active: 2016–present
- Members: Giampaolo Parisi; Marco Parisi

Parisi (stylized in all caps) are an Italian music duo composed of songwriters, producers, and multi-instrumentalist brothers Marco and Jack Parisi. In 2023 the duo signed to a global joint venture with FFRR and Major Recordings, releasing a string of singles, alongside collaborations with Fred Again, Swedish House Mafia and Skrillex. The duo work in electronic, pop, dance-pop, house, and hip-hop.

In 2026 they released the single "This Is Real (Disappear)" with Fred Again and Eyelar.

== Career ==
The brothers honed their writing, production and instrumental skills in their home town of Salerno, Italy, inspired by a diverse range of artists, from Daft Punk to Brian Eno. After relocating to London, they began collaborating with prominent acts such as Swedish House Mafia, Ed Sheeran, Skrillex, Chris Lake, Baauer and Anyma.

They first established themselves with a run of successful singles including "U OK?" with Sebastian Ingrosso and Steve Angello, and their debut single "Believe in Myself", which was named BBC Radio 1's Hottest Record by Danny Howard in November 2023.

Since 2021, Parisi have collaborated numerous times with Fred Again. They are producers on his albums Actual Life 2 (February 2 – October 15 2021) and the Grammy Award-winning Actual Life 3 (January 1 – September 9 2022). They also collaborated with Fred Again and Eyelar on their own single "This Is Real (Disappear)" in 2026.

As a live act, the brothers have performed at festivals and venues including Tomorrowland, Amnesia, Hi Ibiza, Sphere Las Vegas, Coachella and Bonnaroo. Their hybrid live/DJ show Casa Parisi has toured the UK, Europe, and North America.

The duo are ambassadors for the London-based music technology company ROLI, collaborating on new and unexplored technology, which they incorporate into their live shows.

== Discography ==
=== Singles ===
Year	Artist	Title	Album
2016	PARISI ft. RZA	No Refuge	Non-album single
2022	Buy Now, Sebastian Ingrosso, Steve Angello, PARISI	Church	Single
2022	Buy Now, Sebastian Ingrosso, Steve Angello, PARISI	Speak Up	Single
2023	Sebastian Ingrosso, Steve Angello, PARISI	U OK?	Single
2023	PARISI feat. Jelani Blackman	Tease	Single
2023	PARISI	Believe in Myself	Single
2024	Anyma x PARISI	Sacrifice	Single
2024	PARISI	Lights Out	Single
2024	PARISI	High For This	Single
2024	PARISI, Clementine Douglas	Rain	Single
2025	PARISI	Feel It For You	Single
2025	Skrillex, b-girl & PARISI	Korabu	Single
2025	PARISI & Daniel Allan	Man Down	Single
2025	Pete Tong, PARISI & AVG	La Serenissima	Single
2025	PARISI	Mutual Feelings	Single
2025	Fred again.., Danny Brown, BEAM, PARISI & JPEGMAFIA	OK OK	Single
2026	PARISI, Eyelar & Fred again..	This is Real (Disappear)	Single

=== Songwriting/Production Credits ===
Year	Artist	Title	Album	Role
2015	Clementino	Luna	Miracolo!	Producers, Co-Writers, Keys, Bass, Strings Arrangement
2016	Clementino	Lettera Alla Musica	Miracolo!	Producers, Co-Writers, Piano, Programming
2016	TY1	Hardship	Hardship (Entire Album)	Producers, Co-Writers, Programming
2017	Will.i.am	FIYAH	Non-album single	Producers, Bass
2017	TY1 x Clementino x Izi	Resident Evil	Non-album single	Producers, Programming
2018	Capo Plaza	Giovane Fuoriclasse (TY1 Remix)	Non-album remix	Producers, Programming
2019	Ed Sheeran ft. Chance The Rapper & PnB Rock	Cross Me	No.6 Collaborations Project	Synthesisers, Sound Design
2019	Ed Sheeran ft. Travis Scott	Antisocial	No.6 Collaborations Project	Synthesisers, Sound Design
2019	Ed Sheeran ft. H.E.R.	I Don't Want Your Money	No.6 Collaborations Project	Synthesisers, Sound Design, Brass
2019	Ed Sheeran ft. Ella Mai	Put It All On Me	No.6 Collaborations Project	Synthesisers, Sound Design
2019	Clementino	Smoke Bong	Tarantelle	Producers, Programming
2019	Black Eyed Peas ft. Anitta	Explosion	eXplosion	Backing Vocals
2020	Jackson Penn	After All	Non-album single	Producers, Co-Writers
2020	Black Eyed Peas x Maluma	Feel The Beat	Translations	Synthesisers, Sound Fx
2020	Black Eyed Peas x French Montana	Mabuti	Translations	Synthesisers, Sound Fx
2020	Black Eyed Peas x Nicky Jam x Tyga	Vida Loca	Translations	Synthesisers, Sound Fx
2020	Black Eyed Peas x Ozuna x J. Rey Soul	Mamacita	Translations	Synthesisers, Sound Fx
2020	TY1 ft. Capo Plaza & Dosseh	C'est La Vie	Non-album single	Producers, Co-Writers
2020	Marracash ft. Mahmood	Non Sono Marra (La Pelle)	Persona	Producers, Co-Writers, Programming
2020	Marracash ft. Coez	Quelli Che Non Pensano (Il Cervello)	Persona	Bass, Synthetisers
2020	Ed Sheeran	Afterglow	Non-album single	Producers, Synthesisers, Vocoder
2021	Fred Again x Blessed Madonna	Marea (We've Lost Dancing)	Non-album single	Additional Production
2021	Neffa ft. Coez (Prod TY1 )	Aggio Perzo 'o Suonno	Non-album single	Co-Writers, Keyboards, Synths, Bass, Guitar
2021	Fred Again	14 April 2020 (Interlude)	Actual Life (April 14 - December 17 2020)	Co-Writers, Producers, Piano, Sound Design
2021	Fred Again	Dermot (See Yourself In My Eyes)	Actual Life (14 April – 17 December 2020)	Additional Production
2021	Fred Again	Yasminah (See Your Face Again)	Actual Life (14 April – 17 December 2020)	Additional Production
2021	Fred Again	Adam (Interlude)	Actual Life (14 April – 17 December 2020)	Co-Writer, Producers, Sound Design, Programming
2021	Fred Again	Me (Heavy)	Actual Life (14 April – 17 December 2020)	Additional Production
2021	Fred Again	Big Hen (Steal My Joy)	Actual Life (14 April – 17 December 2020)	Co-Writers, Producers, Bass, Piano, Sound Design, Synths
2021	Fred Again	Sabrina (I Am A Party)	Actual Life (14 April – 17 December 2020)	Producers, Synths, Sound Design
2021	Fred Again	Lydia (Please Make It Better)	Actual Life (14 April – 17 December 2020)	Additional Production
2021	Fred Again	Angie (Interlude)	Actual Life (14 April – 17 December 2020)	Co-Writers, Producers
2021	Fred Again	Angie (I've Been Lost)	Actual Life (14 April – 17 December 2020)	Co-Writers, Producers
2021	Ed Sheeran	Bad Habits	Single	Additional Production
2021	Johnny Orlando	It's Alright (From The Netflix Film My Little Pony: A New Generation)	Non-album single	Producers, Songwriters
2021	Joy Anonymous	JOY (Human Again)	Single	Producers, Additional Production
2021	Joy Anonymous	JOY (Man Like)	Human Again	Producers
2021	Joy Anonymous	JOY (Not Sure What I'm Going Through)	Human Again	Producers
2021	Elderbrook	Broken Mirror	Inner Light EP	Producers, Programming
2021	Elderbrook	Dominoes	Inner Light EP	Producers, Programming
2021	Fred Again	2 February 2021	Actual Life 2 (February 2 – October 15 2021)	Producers
2021	Fred Again	Roze (Forgive)	Actual Life 2 (2 February – 15 October 2021)	Producers
2021	Fred Again	Kahan (Last Year)	Actual Life 2 (2 February – 15 October 2021)	Producers
2021	Fred Again	Tate (How I Feel)	Actual Life 2 (2 February – 15 October 2021)	Producers
2021	Fred Again	Hannah (The Sun)	Actual Life 2 (2 February – 15 October 2021)	Producers, Co-writers
2021	Fred Again	Carlos (interlude)	Actual Life 2 (2 February – 15 October 2021)	Producers, Co-writers
2021	Fred Again	Faisal (Envelops Me)	Actual Life 2 (2 February – 15 October 2021)	Producers
2021	Fred Again	Tanya (Maybe Life)	Actual Life 2 (2 February – 15 October 2021)	Producers, Co-writers
2021	Fred Again	Marco (And Everyone)	Actual Life 2 (2 February – 15 October 2021)	Producers, Co-writers
2021	Fred Again	Billie (Loving Arms)	Actual Life 2 (2 February – 15 October 2021)	Producers
2021	Fred Again	Catrin (The City)	Actual Life 2 (2 February – 15 October 2021)	Additional Production
2021	Fred Again	Gigi (What You Went Through)	Actual Life 2 (2 February – 15 October 2021)	Additional Production
2021	Lie Ning	Can I Have This Dance	Non-album single	Producers, Songwriters
2021	Ed Sheeran	Visiting Hours	=	Additional Production
2021	Ed Sheeran	Be Right Now	=	Additional Production
2021	Ashley Park	Mon Soleil	"Emily in Paris" Soundtrack	Producers
2022	Ed Sheeran	Bad Habits (feat. Bring Me the Horizon	Non-album single	Additional Production
2022	Supershy	Change	Non-album single	Co-Production
2022	Supershy	Happy Music	Non-album single	Additional Production
2022	Supershy	Take My Time	Non-album single	Additional Production
2022	Supershy	Something On My Mind	Non-album single	Additional Production
2022	Baauer	Let Me Love U	Single	Co-Production
2022	Swedish House Mafia	Calling On	Paradise Again	Co-Production
2022	Fred Again.. x Swedish House Mafia	Turn On The Lights Again...	Single	Co-Production
2022	Fred Again..	Kammy (like i do)	Actual Life 3 (January 1 - September 9 2022)	Co-Production
2022	Fred Again..	Clara (the night is dark)	Actual Life 3 (1 January – 9 September 2022)	Co-Production
2022	Fred Again..	Kelly (end of the nightmare)	Actual Life 3 (1 January – 9 September 2022)	Co-Production
2022	Fred Again..	Winnie (end of me)	Actual Life 3 (1 January – 9 September 2022)	Co-Production
2022	Fred Again..	Berwyn (all that i got is you)	Actual Life 3 (1 January – 9 September 2022)	Co-Production
2022	Fred Again..	Nathan (still breathing)	Actual Life 3 (1 January – 9 September 2022)	Co-Production
2022	Fred Again..	Bleu (better with time)	Actual Life 3 (1 January – 9 September 2022)	Co-Production
2022	Fred Again..	Danielle (smile on my face)	Actual Life 3 (1 January – 9 September 2022)	Co-Production
2022	Fred Again..	Delilah (pull me out of this)	Actual Life 3 (1 January – 9 September 2022)	Co-Production
2022	Fred Again..	Mustafa (time to move you)	Actual Life 3 (1 January – 9 September 2022)	Co-Production
2022	Black Eyed Peas	In The Air	Elevation	Co-Production
2023	Fred Again..	Mike (desert island duvet)	Single	Co-Production
2023	Swedish House Mafia	Ray of Solar	Single	Producers, Co-writers
2023	Ellie Goulding	Better Man	Higher Than Heaven (Deluxe)	Producers
2023	Romy	Enjoy Your Life	Mid Air	Bass, Drums
2023	Swedish House Mafia feat. Fridayy	See The Light	Single	Co-Writers, Producers, Programming drums, Bass, Keyboard
2023	Chris Lake, Aluna	More Baby	More Baby	Co-Writers, Co-Producers, Synth, Bass, Programming, Sound Design
2023	Holly Humberstone	Baby Blues	Paint My Bedroom Black	Co-Writers, Co-Producers, Vocoder, Programming, Sound Effects, Synths
2023	Joy Anonymous	JOY (Make Some Noise For Yourself)	Cult Classics	Co-Writers, Co-Producers
2023	Fred again..	adore u	Single	Co-Writers, Co-Producers, Keys
2023	The Kid LAROI feat. Future and BabyDrill	What’s The Move	THE FIRST TIME	Co-Writers, Producers, Synth, Sound Design, Keyboard,
2023	The Kid LAROI	Sorry	THE FIRST TIME	Co-Writers, Producers, Synth, Sound Design, Keyboard,
2023	Foy Vance feat. Ed Sheeran, Elton John & Keith Urban	Guiding Light (Anniversary Edition)	Single	Co-Producers
2024	Billy Joel	Turn The Lights Back On	Non-album single	Co-Producers
2024	Lewis Capaldi	The Ancient Art of Always Fucking Up	Broken By Desire To Be Heavenly Sent (Extended Edition)	Co-Producers
2024	Becky Hill	Outside of Love	Outside of Love	Co-Producters, Co-Writers
2024	Anyma	Pictures of You	Genesys II	Co-Producters, Co-Writers
2024	Swedish House Mafia & Niki & The Dove	Lioness	Single	Producers, Co-writers
2025	Fred Again.. & Amyl and the Snifflers	You're A Star	USB002	Musicians
2025	Fred Again.. & Young Thug	Scared	USB002	Musicians
2025	Fred Again.. & BIA	Feisty	USB002	Co-Producers, Co-Writers
2025	Parris Goebel	It's My World	A Girl Is A Drug	Co-Producers, Co-Writers
2026	Madonna featuring Sabrina Carpenter	Bring Your Love	Confessions II	Additional production, drum programming, keyboards

=== Awards ===
Year	Awards Body	Release	Award	Credits
2024	Grammy Awards	Fred again.. - Actual Life 3 (January 1 - September 9 2022)	Best Electronic/Dance Album	Co-writing, co-production
