= Ten Days (album) =

Studio album by Fred Again
- Released: 6 September 2024
- Recorded: 2023 – 18 July 2024
- Genre: House
- Length: 47:13
- Label: Atlantic
- Producers: Will Bloomfield; Boo; Chika; Four Tet; Fred Again; Joy Anonymous; Barney Lister; Parisi; Sampha; Skrillex; Tony Friend; Tobias Wincorn

Fred Again chronology
Secret Life (2023)	Ten Days (2024)	Skepta..Fred (2025)

Singles from Ten Days
- 1. "Adore U" Released: 11 August 2023; 2. "Ten" Released: 13 October 2023; 3. "Places to Be" Released: 31 May 2024; 4. "Peace U Need" Released: 13 September 2024

Ten Days is the fourth studio album from British producer Fred Gibson under the stage name Fred Again. It was released on 6 September 2024 through Atlantic Records, and features guest appearances by Obongjayar, Jozzy, Jim Legxacy, Sampha, Soak, Anderson .Paak, Chika, Duskus, Four Tet, Skrillex, Emmylou Harris, Joy Anonymous, the Japanese House and Scott Hardkiss. Ten Days received nomination for Best Dance/Electronic Album at the 68th Annual Grammy Awards.

== Background ==
On 18 July 2024, the producer announced that he had just finished the album. Gibson explained the idea behind the album title to be "ten songs about ten days". He further reminisced about the experiences he made over the previous year, saying that the most memorable moments stem from "very small quiet intimate moments". The album will be released on vinyl on 25 October. It includes the singles "Adore U", "Ten" and "Places to Be".

== Critical reception ==
Professional ratings
Aggregate scores
Source	Rating
Metacritic	73/100
Review scores
Source	Rating
AllMusic	3.5/5 stars
And It Don't Stop	A−
Clash	9/10
Dork	4/5 stars
Evening Standard	3/5 stars
The Guardian	3/5 stars
The Line of Best Fit	7/10
MusicOMH	3/5 stars
NME	4/5 stars
Rolling Stone	3.5/5 stars

According to the review aggregator Metacritic, Ten Days received "generally favorable reviews" based on a weighted average score of 73 out of 100 from 9 critic scores.

Jem Aswad's review for Variety states that "while much of the music here will sound familiar to fans, Gibson is morphing it into new shapes throughout the album." Writing for NME, Rhian Daly states that the album "excels on two fronts – when Fred and his collaborators dig up a more interesting take on the influence of love, and when the producer turns his sights to the dancefloor." Michaelangelo Matos' review for Rolling Stone states that the album's "glittery, affectless quality that can feel like a lack of commitment, even as you note the sheer amount going on during a given track." In his review for The Guardian, Alexis Petridis writes: "a kind of vague all-purpose wistfulness – a signifier of depth, rather than the definite article – hangs over virtually everything here." Vicky Jessop of Evening Standard, writes the album is "some of the most heartfelt stuff that Fred again.. has ever put out, but it’s also some of the least catchy." Clash's Harvey Marwood concludes his review stating that the album "explores the contours of the dancefloor whilst never forgoing its gushy, human centre." Writing for Dork, Martyn Young described the album as "immaculately crafted with his ear for a hook sharper than ever." Resident Advisor's Shaad D'Souza called the album "another uncomplicated, largely forgettable LP that feels trapped in a nostalgia loop." Writing for The Line of Best Fit, Hayley Milross wrote that the album "has a brand new way of being vulnerable, one that sways between euphoric highs and more introspective realisations." Reviewing the album for AllMusic, Paul Simpson described it as, "Short, numbered interludes, often drunken singalongs or muddled messages, alternate between proper songs, letting intimate moments set the stage for radio-friendly anthems."

== Track listing ==
Ten Days track listing
No.	Title	Writer(s)	Producer(s)	Length
1.	".One"	Fred Gibson; Henry Counsell; Berwyn Du Bois; Georgie Gibson; Minnie Gibson; Michael Gordon; Bridie Monds-Watson	Fred Again	0:30
2.	"Adore U" (with Obongjayar)	F. Gibson; Barney Lister; Mark Morales; Marco Parisi; Darren Robinson; Steven Umoh; Damon Yul Wimbley; Tobias Wincorn	Fred Again; Four Tet; Parisi; Wincorn	3:40
3.	".Two"	F. Gibson	Fred Again	0:10
4.	"Ten" (with Jozzy and Jim Legxacy)	F. Gibson; Jocelyn Donald; James Olaloye	Fred Again; Tony Friend	3:01
5.	".Three"	F. Gibson	Fred Again	0:15
6.	"Fear Less" (with Sampha)	F. Gibson; Kemani Duggan; Kieran Hebden; Philip Koutev; Hilko Nijhof; Sadiqur Rahman; Sampha Sisay; Cassiel Wuta-Ofei	Fred Again; Four Tet; Parisi; Sampha	3:34
7.	".Four"	F. Gibson	Fred Again	0:09
8.	"Just Stand There" (with Soak)	F. Gibson; Ori Alboher; Gemma Doherty; Monds-Watson; Olaloye; Wincorn	Fred Again; Parisi; Wincorn	4:20
9.	".Five"	F. Gibson	Fred Again	0:15
10.	"Places to Be" (with Anderson .Paak and Chika)	F. Gibson; Brandon Paak Anderson; Lamont T. Butts; Benjy Gibson; Jane Chika Oranika; Tyshane Thompson; Winston L. Virgo	Fred Again; Boo; Skrillex	3:46
11.	".Six"	F. Gibson	Fred Again	0:28
12.	"Glow" (with Duskus, Four Tet and Skrillex)	F. Gibson; Louis Curran; Hebden; Sonny Moore; Simon White	Fred Again; Duskus; Four Tet; Joy Anonymous; Skrillex	7:33
13.	".Seven"	Ryan Beatty; Ethan Gruska	Fred Again	0:31
14.	"I Saw You"	F. Gibson; Counsell; Faisal Salah	Fred Again	3:40
15.	".Eight"	F. Gibson	Fred Again	0:15
16.	"Where Will I Be" (with Emmylou Harris)	F. Gibson; Daniel Lanois; Giampaolo Parisi; M. Parisi	Fred Again; Joy Anonymous; Parisi	3:20
17.	".Nine"	F. Gibson	Fred Again	0:19
18.	"Peace U Need" (with Joy Anonymous)	F. Gibson; Snoh Aalegra; Dante Bacote; Will Bloomfield; Counsell; Curran; Leon Michels; Nick Movshon; Ed Phillips; Nicole Wray	Fred Again; Barney Lister; Joy Anonymous; Bloomfield	5:44
19.	".Ten"	F. Gibson; Gordon	Fred Again	0:29
20.	"Backseat" (with the Japanese House and Scott Hardkiss)	F. Gibson; Amber Bain; Doherty; Scott Hardkiss; Monds-Watson; G. Parisi; M. Parisi	Fred Again; Joy Anonymous; Parisi	5:14
Total length:				47:13

== Personnel ==
Musicians

- Fred Again – programming (all tracks), vocals (tracks 1, 4, 6, 10, 16, 18)
- Marco Parisi – programming (track 2), synthesizer (6, 12, 16, 20), piano (8), sound effects (16)
- Four Tet – additional programming (track 2), programming (12)
- Damon Yul Wimbley – backing vocals (track 2)
- Darren Robinson – backing vocals (track 2)
- Mark Morales – backing vocals (track 2)
- Tobias Wincorn – programming (track 2)
- Obongjayar – vocals (track 2)
- Jim Legxacy – vocals (track 4), backing vocals (8)
- Jozzy – vocals (track 4)
- Giampaolo Parisi – sound effects (tracks 6, 8, 16), percussion (12, 20), synthesizer (16)
- Sampha – programming, vocals (track 6)
- Bandokay – backing vocals (track 6)
- Soak – vocals (track 8), backing vocals (20)
- Ori Alboher – backing vocals (track 8)
- Beam – backing vocals (track 9)
- Anderson .Paak – vocals (track 10)
- Chika – vocals (track 10)
- Duskus – programming (track 12)
- Skrillex – programming (track 12)
- Ryan Beatty – vocals (track 13)
- Emmylou Harris – vocals (track 16)
- Snoh Aalegra – backing vocals (track 18)
- Joy Anonymous – vocals (track 18)
- Scott Hardkiss – programming (track 20)
- The Japanese House – vocals (track 20)

Technical

- Fred Again – mastering, mixing, engineering
- Four Tet – mastering, mixing (track 2)
- Skrillex – mastering, mixing (tracks 10, 12)
- Matt J. Barnes – engineering (tracks 1, 3–9, 11–14, 16–20)
- Drew Gold – engineering assistance (10)
- Katie Foreman – engineering assistance (tracks 14, 16)

== Charts ==
=== Weekly charts ===
Weekly chart performance for Ten Days
Chart (2024–2025)	Peak position
Australian Albums (ARIA)	3
Austrian Albums (Ö3 Austria)	13
Belgian Albums (Ultratop Flanders)	3
Belgian Albums (Ultratop Wallonia)	29
Canadian Albums (Billboard)	57
Danish Albums (Hitlisten)	12
Dutch Albums (Album Top 100)	11
Finnish Albums (Suomen virallinen lista)	45
French Albums (SNEP)	65
German Albums (Offizielle Top 100)	12
Hungarian Albums (MAHASZ)	34
Irish Albums (Official Charts)	11
Italian Albums (FIMI)	81
Lithuanian Albums (AGATA)	23
New Zealand Albums (RMNZ)	5
Norwegian Albums (VG-lista)	11
Polish Albums (ZPAV)	25
Portuguese Albums (AFP)	14
Scottish Albums (Official Charts)	15
Spanish Albums (Promusicae)	30
Swedish Albums (Sverigetopplistan)	18
Swiss Albums (Schweizer Hitparade)	4
UK Albums (Official Charts)	7
UK Dance Albums (Official Charts)	1
US Billboard 200	166
US Top Dance/Electronic Albums (Billboard)	3

=== Year-end charts ===
Year-end chart performance for Ten Days
Chart	Year	Position
Australian Dance Albums (ARIA)	2024	14
Belgian Albums (Ultratop Flanders)	2025	190

== Certifications ==
Certifications for Ten Days
Region	Certification	Certified units/sales
United Kingdom (BPI)	Silver	60,000^{‡}
^{‡} Sales+streaming figures based on certification alone.
