= Grammy Award for Best Dance/Electronic Album =

Annual music award

- Eusexua by FKA Twigs is the most recent recipient
- Awarded for: Quality vocal or instrumental dance music or electronica albums
- Country: United States
- Presented by: National Academy of Recording Arts and Sciences
- First award: 2005
- Currently held by: FKA Twigs — Eusexua (2026)

Highlights
- Most wins: Skrillex & The Chemical Brothers (3)
- Most nominations: The Chemical Brothers (7)
- Website: grammy.com

The Grammy Award for Best Dance/Electronic Album is an award presented at the Grammy Awards to honor quality dance and electronica albums in any given year. The award was first presented at the 47th Annual Grammy Awards in 2005 as a complement to the Grammy Award for Best Dance/Electronic Recording, which had been presented as the sole award for dance music since 1998.

According to The Recording Academy, the award "recognizes excellence in recordings from established dance and electronic genres such as house, techno, trance, dubstep, drum and bass, electronica, as well as other emerging dance and electronic genres, with production and sensibilities distinctly different from a pop approach." The award is presented to "albums containing at least 50% dance/electronic recordings". Compilation or remixed recording albums are not eligible for this category.

To date, Skrillex and The Chemical Brothers hold the record for most wins in this category, with three times, followed by two-time recipients Daft Punk.

In addition, The Chemical Brothers hold the record for most nominations with seven. Madonna was the first female recipient of the award in 2007. Robyn holds the record for most nominations without a win with four.

== History ==
- From 2005 to 2011, the award was known as Best Electronic/Dance Album.
- From 2012 to 2014, the award was known as Best Dance/Electronica Album.
- From 2015 to 2023, the award was known as Best Dance/Electronic Music Album.
- From 2024 onwards the award is known as Best Dance/Electronic Album.

Like most album categories, the lead performing artist (of greater than 50% of playing time on the album), receives a nomination. The actual Grammy is awarded to the performing artist, the producer and the engineer / mixer if they worked on more than 50% of playing time of the album. From 2027, songwriters of new songs are also awarded a statuette if they have worked on more than 50% of the album playing time. Any personnel that worked on less than 50% of playing time can apply for a Winners Certificate.

As of the 66th Annual Grammy Awards, the category sits in the newly-established Pop & Dance/Electronic genre field.

Madonna, Lady Gaga, Beyoncé, Charli XCX and FKA twigs are the only female artists to ever win the award.

== Recipients ==
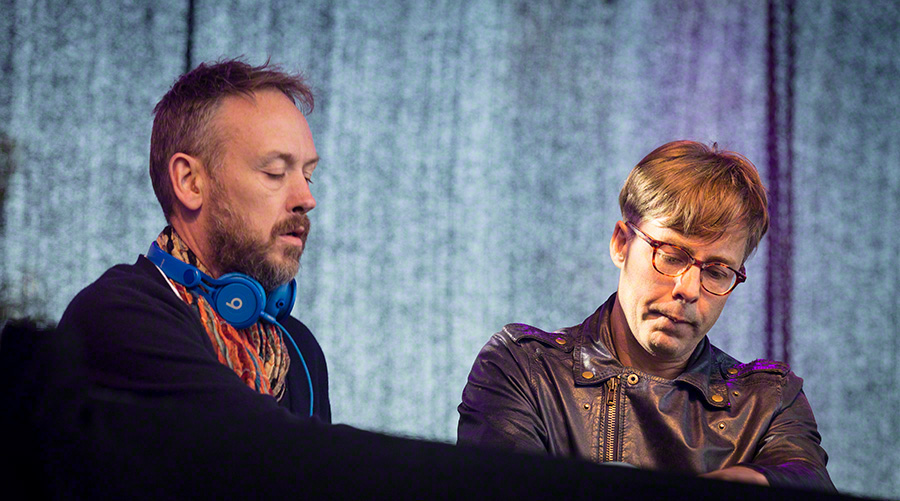
Basement Jaxx were the first winners of the award, in 2005.

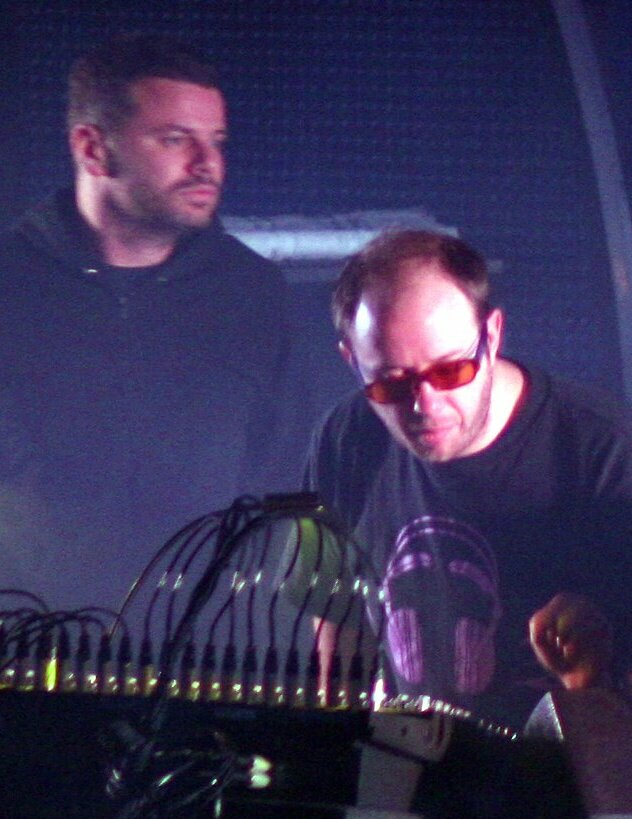
The Chemical Brothers were the first to receive the award twice, in 2006 and 2008, and won for a third time in 2020, tying Skrillex as the most awarded acts in the category.

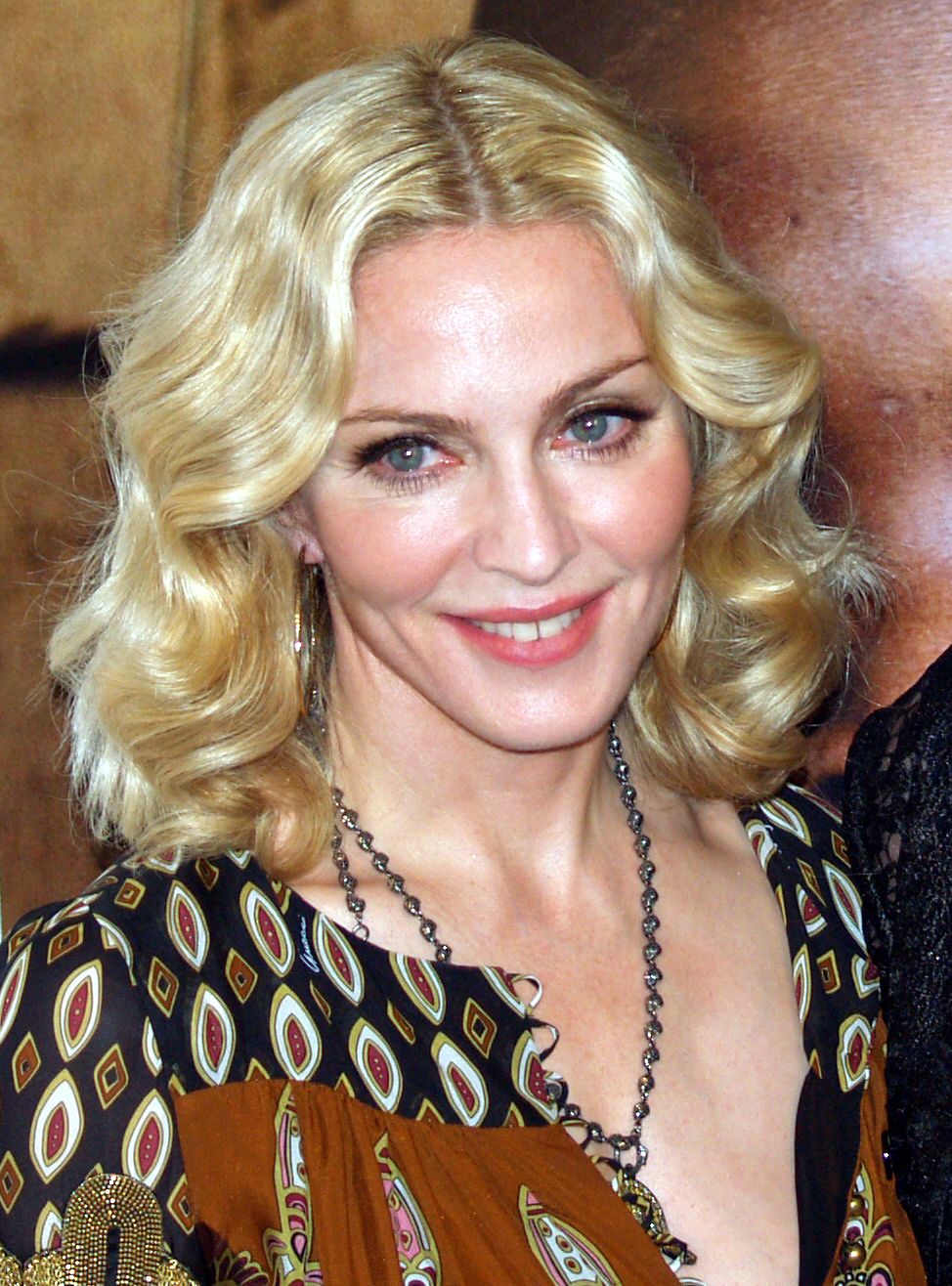
Madonna became the first solo singer to win this award in 2007. She also became the first female act to be nominated and win in the category.

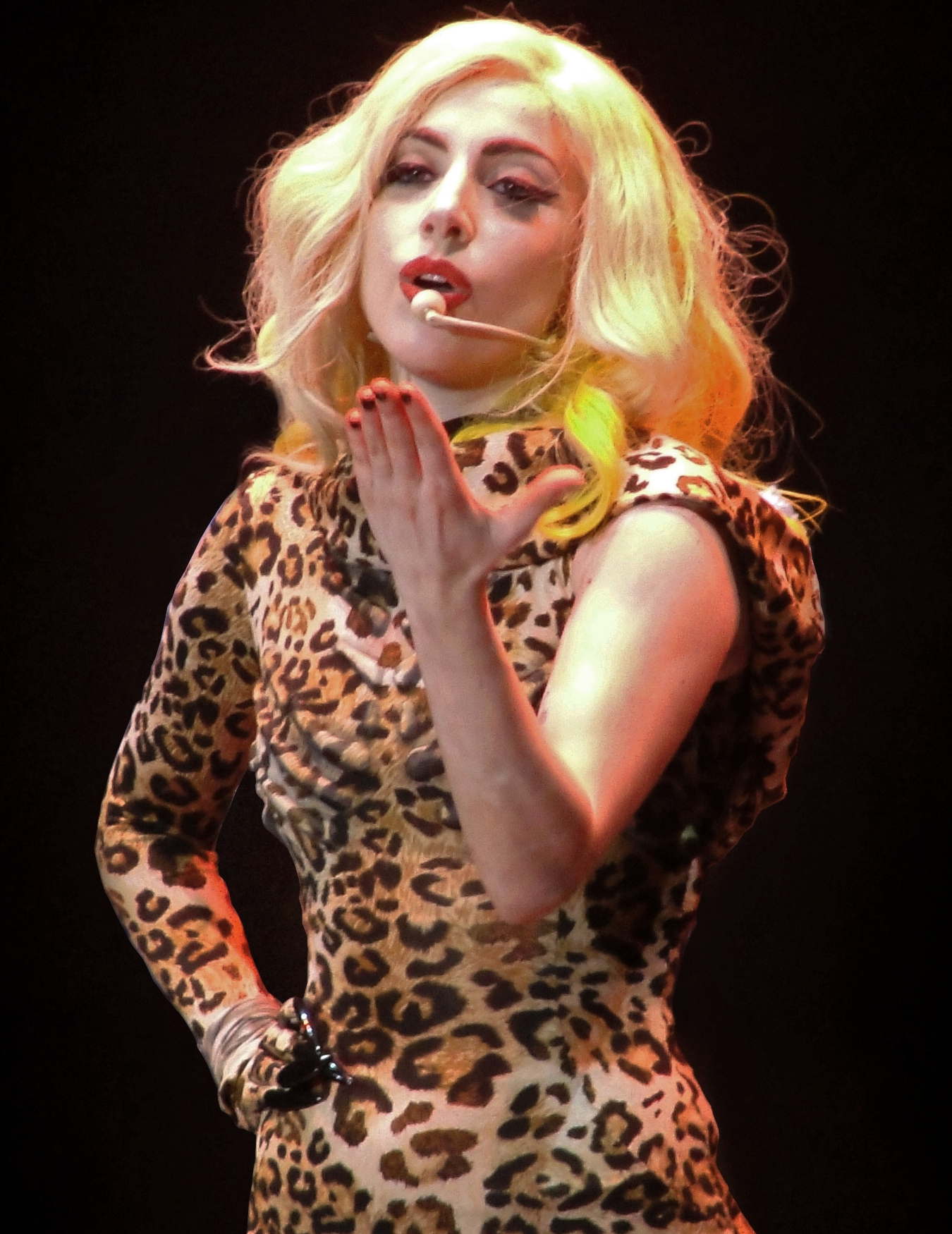
Lady Gaga became the second female artist to win in the category. She was also the first to be nominated with the same album in the Album of the Year category.

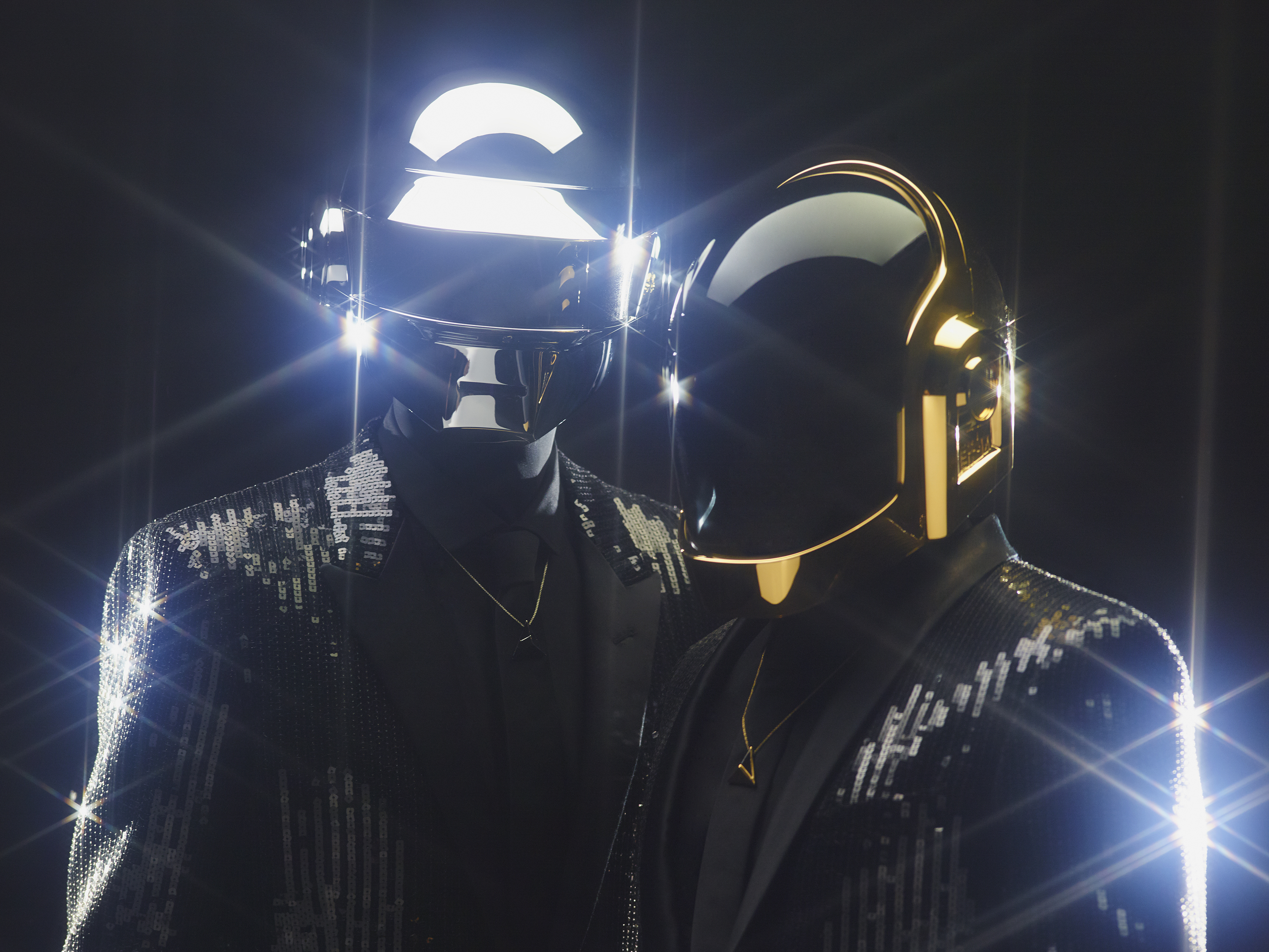
Daft Punk won this award twice in 2009 and 2014. Random Access Memories was the first electronic album to win in the Album of the Year category.

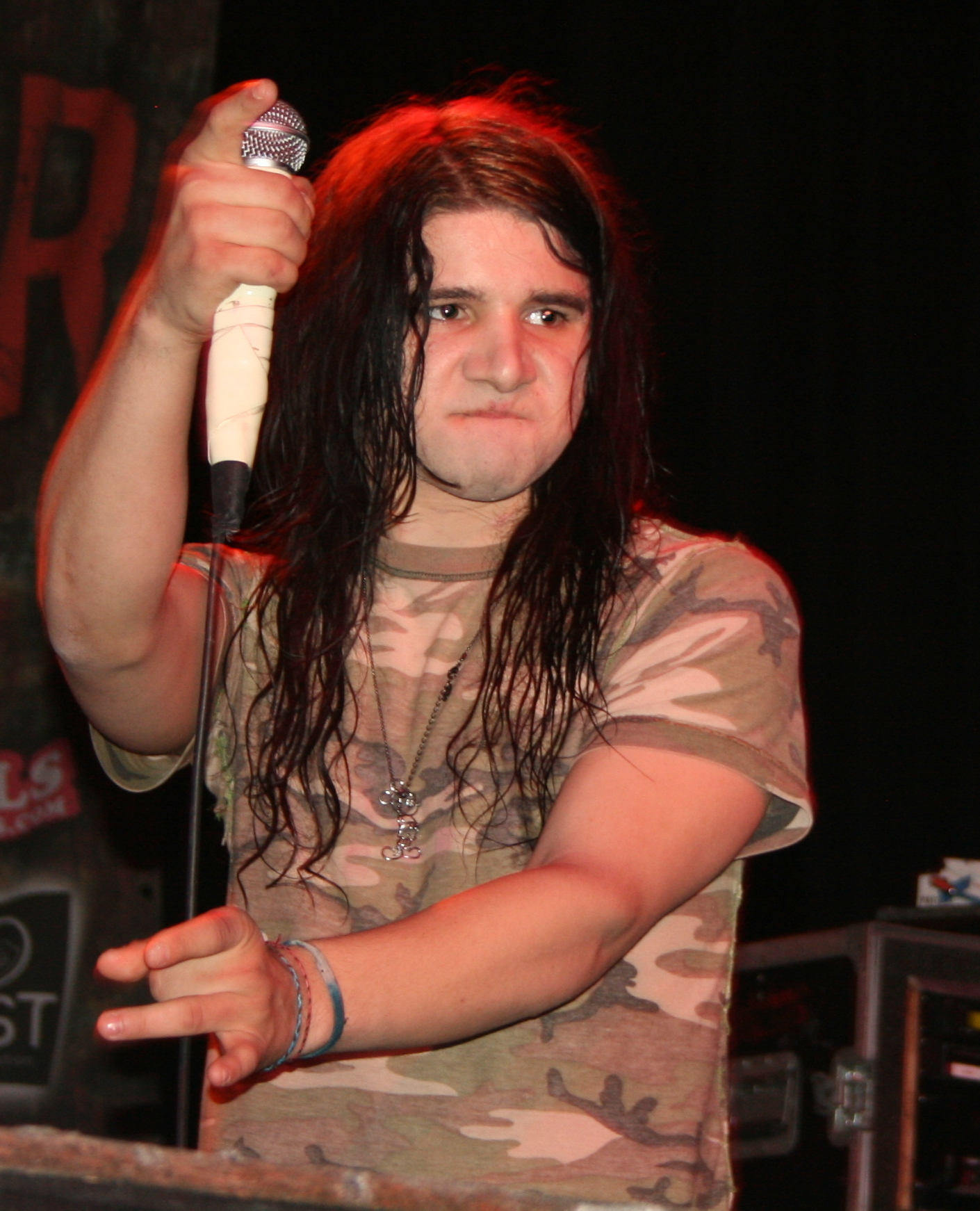
Skrillex won this award three times in 2012, 2013 and 2016, becoming one of the most awarded artists in the category, tying The Chemical Brothers.

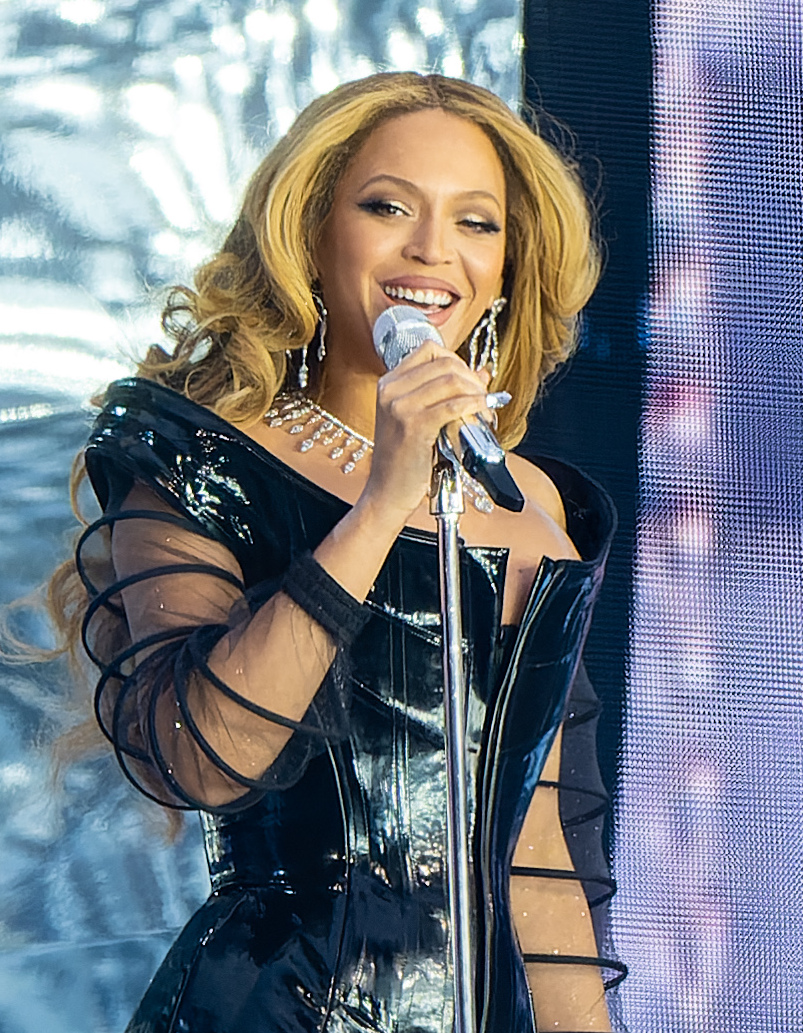
Beyoncé was the fourth female artist and the first African American female artist to win in the category.

=== 2000s ===
Year	Work	Artist	Winning producer(s)/mixer(s)
2005	Kish Kash	Basement Jaxx	Basement Jaxx, producers
2005	Always Outnumbered, Never Outgunned	The Prodigy	
2005	Creamfields	Paul Oakenfold	
2005	Legion of Boom	The Crystal Method	
2005	Reflections	Paul van Dyk	
2006	Push the Button	The Chemical Brothers	Chemical Brothers, producers
2006	Human After All	Daft Punk	
2006	LCD Soundsystem	LCD Soundsystem	
2006	Minimum-Maximum	Kraftwerk	
2006	Palookaville	Fatboy Slim	
2007	Confessions on a Dance Floor	Madonna	Stuart Price, producer; Mark Stent, engineer/mixer
2007	Fundamental	Pet Shop Boys	
2007	The Garden	Zero 7	
2007	A Lively Mind	Paul Oakenfold	
2007	Supernature	Goldfrapp	
2008	We Are the Night	The Chemical Brothers	Chemical Brothers, producers
2008	†	Justice	
2008	Elements of Life	Tiësto	
2008	Sound of Silver	LCD Soundsystem	
2008	We Are Pilots	Shiny Toy Guns	
2009	Alive 2007	Daft Punk	Peter Franco, engineer/mixer
2009	Bring Ya to the Brink	Cyndi Lauper	
2009	Last Night	Moby	
2009	New York City	Brazilian Girls	
2009	Robyn	Robyn	
2009	X	Kylie Minogue	

=== 2010s ===
Year	Work	Artist	Winning producer(s)/mixer(s)
2010	The Fame	Lady Gaga	Robert Orton, engineer/mxier
2010	Divided by Night	The Crystal Method	
2010	One Love	David Guetta	
2010	Party Rock	LMFAO	
2010	Yes	Pet Shop Boys	
2011	La Roux	La Roux	La Roux, producers; Serban Ghenea, John Hanes & Ian Sherwin, engineers/mixers
2011	Black Light	Groove Armada	
2011	Further	The Chemical Brothers	
2011	Head First	Goldfrapp	
2011	These Hopeful Machines	BT	
2012	Scary Monsters and Nice Sprites	Skrillex	Skrillex, producer/engineer/mixer
2012	4x4=12	Deadmau5	
2012	Body Talk Pt. 3	Robyn	
2012	Nothing but the Beat	David Guetta	
2012	Zonoscope	Cut Copy	
2013	Bangarang	Skrillex	Skrillex, producer/engineer/mixer
2013	Album Title Goes Here	Deadmau5	
2013	Don't Think	The Chemical Brothers	
2013	Fire & Ice	Kaskade	
2013	Wonderland	Steve Aoki	
2014	Random Access Memories	Daft Punk	Daft Punk (Thomas Bangalter & Guy-Manuel de Homem-Christo), producers; Peter Franco, Mick Guzauski & Florian Lagatta, engineers/mixers
2014	18 Months	Calvin Harris	
2014	Atmosphere	Kaskade	
2014	A Color Map of the Sun	Pretty Lights	
2014	Settle	Disclosure	
2015	Syro	Aphex Twin	Aphex Twin (producer)
2015	Damage Control	Mat Zo	
2015	Do It Again	Röyksopp and Robyn	
2015	Nabuma Rubberband	Little Dragon	
2015	While (1<2)	Deadmau5	
2016	Skrillex and Diplo Present Jack Ü	Skrillex & Diplo (Jack Ü)	Skrillex, Diplo (producers)
2016	Born in the Echoes	The Chemical Brothers	
2016	Caracal	Disclosure	
2016	In Colour	Jamie xx	
2016	Our Love	Caribou	
2017	Skin	Flume	Eric J. Dubowsky (engineer/mixer)
2017	Barbara Barbara, We Face a Shining Future	Underworld	
2017	Electronica 1: The Time Machine	Jean-Michel Jarre	
2017	Epoch	Tycho	
2017	Louie Vega Starring...XXVIII	Louie Vega	
2018	3-D The Catalogue	Kraftwerk	Serge Gräfe (engineer/mixer)
2018	Migration	Bonobo	
2018	A Moment Apart	Odesza	
2018	Mura Masa	Mura Masa	
2018	What Now	Sylvan Esso	
2019	Woman Worldwide	Justice	Justice (producers/engineers/mixers)
2019	Lune Rouge	Tokimonsta	
2019	Oil of Every Pearl's Un-Insides	Sophie	
2019	Singularity	Jon Hopkins	
2019	Treehouse	Sofi Tukker	

=== 2020s ===
Year	Work	Artist	Winning producer/engineer
2020	No Geography	The Chemical Brothers	Chemical Brothers (producers); Steve Dub Jones (engineer/mixer)
2020	Hi This Is Flume	Flume	
2020	LP5	Apparat	
2020	Solace	Rüfüs Du Sol	
2020	Weather	Tycho	
2021	Bubba	Kaytranada	Kaytranada, producer; Lauren D'Elia & NealHPogue, engineers/mixers
2021	Energy	Disclosure	
2021	Good Faith	Madeon	
2021	Kick I	Arca	
2021	Planet's Mad	Baauer	
2022	Subconsciously	Black Coffee	Black Coffee, producer; Kevin KD Davis, engineer/mixer
2022	Fallen Embers	Illenium	
2022	Free Love	Sylvan Esso	
2022	Judgement	Ten City	
2022	Music Is the Weapon (Reloaded)	Major Lazer	
2022	Shockwave	Marshmello	
2023	Renaissance	Beyoncé	Beyoncé & Terius "The-Dream" Gesteelde-Diamant, producers; Stuart White, engineer/mixer
2023	Diplo	Diplo	
2023	Fragments	Bonobo	
2023	The Last Goodbye	Odesza	
2023	Surrender	Rüfüs Du Sol	
2024	Actual Life 3 (January 1 – September 9 2022)	Fred Again	Fred again.., Giampaolo Parisi & Marco Parisi, producers; Jay Reynolds, engineer/mixer
2024	For That Beautiful Feeling	The Chemical Brothers	
2024	Kx5	Deadmau5 and Kaskade	
2024	Playing Robots into Heaven	James Blake	
2024	Quest for Fire	Skrillex	
2025	Brat	Charli XCX	Alexander Guy Cook (producer); Idania Valencia (engineer/mixer)
2025	Hyperdrama	Justice	
2025	Telos	Zedd	
2025	Three	Four Tet	
2025	Timeless	Kaytranada	
2026	Eusexua	FKA Twigs	Marius de Vries & Koreless (producers); Jon Castelli, Brad Lauchert & Jonny Leslie (engineers/mixers)
2026	Fancy That	PinkPantheress	
2026	Fuck U Skrillex You Think Ur Andy Warhol but Ur Not!! <3	Skrillex	
2026	Inhale / Exhale	Rüfüs Du Sol	
2026	Ten Days	Fred Again	
2027	Confessions II	Madonna	Winners TBA on 7 February 2027
2027	Deadbeat	Tame Impala	
2027	Sexistential	Robyn	
2027	Soma	Skrillex	
2027	Worst Girl in America	Slayyyter	

^{^[I]} Each year is linked to the article about the Grammy Awards held that year.

== Artists with multiple wins ==
3 wins

- The Chemical Brothers
- Skrillex

2 wins

- Daft Punk

== Artists with multiple nominations ==
7 nominations

- The Chemical Brothers

6 nominations

- Skrillex

4 nominations

- Deadmau5 (1 with Kx5)
- Robyn

3 nominations

- Daft Punk
- Disclosure
- Justice
- Kaskade (1 with Kx5)
- Rüfüs Du Sol

2 nominations

- Bonobo
- The Crystal Method
- Goldfrapp
- David Guetta
- Diplo
- Flume
- Fred Again
- Kaytranada
- Kraftwerk
- LCD Soundsystem
- Madonna
- Paul Oakenfold
- Odesza
- Pet Shop Boys
- Sylvan Esso
- Tycho

== See also ==
- Dance Music Hall of Fame
