= Adore U =

Single by Fred Again and Obongjayar

from the album Ten Days
- Released: 11 August 2023
- Genre: House
- Length: 3:40
- Label: Warner Music UK; Atlantic
- Songwriters: Fred Gibson; Steven Umoh; Barney Lister; Damon Yul Wimbley; Darren Robinson; Mark Morales; Tobias Wincorn
- Producers: Fred Again; Four Tet; Parisi; Tobias Wincorn

Fred Again singles chronology
"Baby again.." (2023)	"Adore U" (2023)	"Ten" (2023)

Obongjayar singles chronology
"Just Cool" (2023)	"Adore U" (2023)

Audio video
- "Adore U" on YouTube

"Adore U" is a song by British producer Fred Again (Fred Gibson) and London-based Nigerian musician Obongjayar (Steven Umoh). It was released on 11 August 2023 through Warner Music UK and Atlantic as the lead single of Gibson's fourth studio album, Ten Days (2024).

== Background and promotion ==
Gibson debuted the song live as part of his Glastonbury Festival set on 23 June 2023. On 4 August, the duo first teased the track through a clip they shared on their social media. It shows Gibson accompanying Umoh on the keyboard while the latter lends his vocals to the song. Gibson commented the setting, saying that it "felt magical" hearing "this beautiful man sing". Gibson and Umoh later performed the song at Lollapalooza in Chicago that same week.

== Composition ==
"Adore U" is dedicated to Gibson's sister and samples "I Wish It Was Me", taken from Obongjayar's debut studio album Some Nights I Dream Of Doors (2022). The "heartfelt" song finds Obonjayar "chilling vocals" "purring and quivering over increasingly warm and euphoric house music" which is eventually backed by a prominent hip-hop sample that "seamlessly integrates without disrupting the vibrant atmosphere". The beat is supported by "a bed of bubbling synths" and a touch of Gibson's "infectious, dancy goodness".

== Charts ==
=== Weekly charts ===
Weekly chart performance for "Adore U"
Chart (2023)	Peak position
Australia (ARIA)	41
Belgium (Ultratop 50 Flanders)	45
Ireland (IRMA)	1
Netherlands (Single Top 100)	80
New Zealand (Recorded Music NZ)	39
UK Singles (OCC)	4
UK Dance (OCC)	1
US Hot Dance/Electronic Songs (Billboard)	16

=== Year-end charts ===
Year-end chart performance for "Adore U"
Chart (2024)	Position
Australia Dance (ARIA)	15

== Certifications ==
Region	Certification	Certified units/sales
Australia (ARIA)	Platinum	70,000^{‡}
Canada (Music Canada)	Gold	40,000^{‡}
New Zealand (RMNZ)	Platinum	30,000^{‡}
United Kingdom (BPI)	Platinum	600,000^{‡}
^{‡} Sales+streaming figures based on certification alone.
