= Gang (mixtape) =

Mixtape by Headie One and Fred Again
- Released: 3 April 2020
- Genre: Drill
- Length: 22:13
- Label: Relentless

Headie One chronology
Drillers x Trappers II (2019)	Gang (2020)	Edna (2020)

Fred Again chronology
Gang (2020)	Actual Life (2020)

Gang is a collaborative mixtape between Headie One and Fred Again. It was released on 3 April 2020 through Relentless Records. The album features several other United Kingdom-based artists, Jamie xx, FKA Twigs, and Sampha are all named features, while Slowthai is sampled.

== Track listing ==
Gang track listing
No.	Title	Length
1.	"Told"	2:48
2.	"Gang"	2:39
3.	"Judge Me (Interlude)" (featuring FKA Twigs)	1:56
4.	"Charades"	3:39
5.	"Smoke" (featuring Jamie xx)	3:48
6.	"The Boys (Interlude)"	1:21
7.	"Know Me"	2:52
8.	"Soldiers" (featuring Sampha)	3:10
Total length:		22:13

== Charts ==
Chart performance for Gang
Chart (2020)	Peak position
UK Albums (OCC)	49
UK R&B Albums (OCC)	10
