= Put It All on Me =

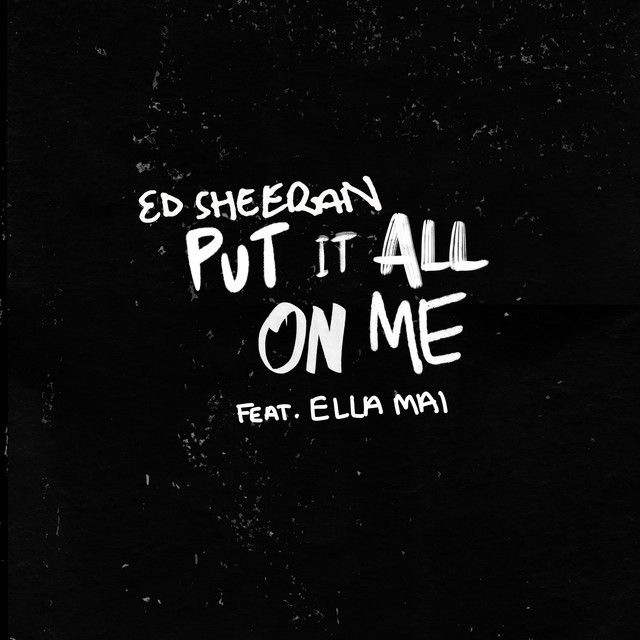

Song by Ed Sheeran featuring Ella Mai

from the album No.6 Collaborations Project
- Released: 12 July 2019
- Genre: Pop
- Length: 3:17
- Label: Asylum; Atlantic
- Songwriters: Ed Sheeran; Ella Howell; Fred Gibson
- Producer: Fred

Music video
- "Put It All on Me" on YouTube

"Put It All on Me" is a song by English singer-songwriter Ed Sheeran featuring fellow English singer-songwriter Ella Mai written alongside producer Fred as a track from the former's fourth studio album, No.6 Collaborations Project, released through Asylum Records and Atlantic Records on 12 July 2019.

== Lyrics ==
The lyrics of the song is about someone they love and how they can always rely on each other. It describes the affection between Sheeran and Mai then the former sings about how he needs the touch and warmth of his woman following a hard day of interaction with the world. Also, his girl is his escape into bliss. The chorus of the song deals with Sheeran offering the girl the same patronage while inviting his girl to put all her troubles and worries on him hoping that he will absorb them away from her. Mai had a hard time putting words about how she feels for Sheeran. In this relationship, the couple created a perfect balance as they rely and depend on each other which is quite beautiful.

== Lyric video ==
A lyric video for the song was uploaded on Sheeran's YouTube account on 12 July 2019.

== Music video ==
A music video for the song was released on 22 December 2019, which was directed by Jason Koenig.

== Chart performance ==
"Put It All on Me" charted at number 48, 71, 3 and 22 in Australia, Canada, Swedish Heatseeker Chart and Bubbling Under Hot 100, respectively.

== Charts ==
Chart (2019)	Peak position
Australia (ARIA)	48
Canada Hot 100 (Billboard)	20
Swedish Heatseeker Chart	3
US Bubbling Under Hot 100 (Billboard)	22

== Certifications ==
Region	Certification	Certified units/sales
Canada (Music Canada)	Gold	40,000^{‡}
New Zealand (RMNZ)	Gold	15,000^{‡}
United Kingdom (BPI)	Silver	200,000^{‡}
^{‡} Sales+streaming figures based on certification alone.
