= Marea (We've Lost Dancing) =

2021 song by Fred Again and the Blessed Madonna

Single by Fred Again and the Blessed Madonna

from the album Actual Life (April 14 – December 17 2020)
- Released: 22 February 2021
- Genre: Deep house; house
- Length: 4:48
- Label: Again.; Atlantic
- Songwriters: Fred Gibson; Marea Stamper; Thibaud Noyer
- Producers: Alex Gibson; Boston Bun; Fred Again

Fred Again singles chronology
"Gang" (2020)	"Marea (We've Lost Dancing)" (2021)	"Dermot (See Yourself in My Eyes)" (2021)

"Marea (we've lost dancing)" is a song by Fred Again and the Blessed Madonna (first name Marea), released on 22 February 2021 through Again. and Atlantic UK.

== Background and release ==
The song was created by Fred Again following a conversation with the Blessed Madonna. The lyrics were created by sampling the Blessed Madonna's speech. It was released on Atlantic Records on 22 February 2021.

In March 2021, Fred Again announced his debut solo album, Actual Life (April 14 – December 17 2020), which includes this song.

== Lyrics and composition ==
The song describes the loss of dancing and clubbing during the COVID-19 pandemic, but also looks forward to its return.

== Remix ==
In June 2021, the song was remixed by Diplo.

== Charts ==
=== Weekly charts ===
Weekly chart performance for "Marea (We've Lost Dancing)"
Chart (2021–2022)	Peak position
Belgium (Ultratop 50 Flanders)	12
Belgium (Ultratop 50 Wallonia)	45
Hungary (Dance Top 40)	22
Hungary (Single Top 40)	29
Ireland (IRMA)	41
Lithuania (AGATA)	30
Netherlands (Dutch Top 40)	22
Netherlands (Single Top 100)	11
UK Singles (Official Charts)	36
UK Dance (Official Charts)	15
US Hot Dance/Electronic Songs (Billboard)	33

=== Year-end charts ===
2021 year-end chart performance for "Marea (We've Lost Dancing)"
Chart (2021)	Position
Belgium (Ultratop Flanders)	48
Hungary (Dance Top 40)	74
Netherlands (Single Top 100)	63

2022 year-end chart performance for "Marea (We've Lost Dancing)"
Chart (2022)	Position
Belgium (Ultratop 50 Flanders)	182

== Certifications ==
Certifications for "Marea (We've Lost Dancing)"
Region	Certification	Certified units/sales
Australia (ARIA)	Gold	35,000^{‡}
Austria (IFPI Austria)	Gold	15,000^{‡}
Canada (Music Canada)	Platinum	80,000^{‡}
Denmark (IFPI Danmark)	Gold	45,000^{‡}
France (SNEP)	Platinum	200,000^{‡}
Germany (BVMI)	Gold	300,000^{‡}
Italy (FIMI)	Gold	50,000^{‡}
Netherlands (NVPI)	Platinum	80,000^{‡}
New Zealand (RMNZ)	Platinum	30,000^{‡}
Poland (ZPAV)	Platinum	50,000^{‡}
Spain (Promusicae)	Gold	30,000^{‡}
United Kingdom (BPI)	Platinum	600,000^{‡}
^{‡} Sales+streaming figures based on certification alone.

== Other media ==
The song is featured in the 2022 satirical black comedy film Triangle of Sadness by Ruben Östlund.
