= Secret Life (album) =

Studio album by Fred Again and Brian Eno
- Released: 5 May 2023
- Recorded: 4 April 2020–23 December 2022
- Genre: Ambient
- Length: 44:33
- Label: Text
- Producer: Aaron Dessner; Brian Eno; Buddy Ross; Eyelar; Fred Again; Joy Anonymous; Leif Vollebekk

Fred Again chronology
| Actual Life 3 (January 1 – September 9 2022) (2022) | Secret Life (2023) | Ten Days (2024) |

Brian Eno chronology
| Lateral (2025) | Secret Life (2023) |

Secret Life is a collaborative studio album between British recording artists Fred Again and Brian Eno released on 5 May 2023 through Four Tet's label Text Records.

== Background and release ==
Secret Life is the first collaborative release from Fred Again and Brian Eno, although they have been colleagues since 2014, when Fred Again received writing credits on Eno's Someday World and High Life. Eno then became Fred Again's mentor, saying that "when I first worked with Fred I could see he was brilliant". Eno has stated that Fred Again also acted as his mentor with respect to learning contemporary music.

Secret Life was announced on 2 May 2023 by Four Tet, an English producer with whom Fred Again had previously worked and toured, earlier in the year, with Four Tet calling it "the most beautiful album of 2023". The announcement included the release date of 5 May. Prior to its release, previews of songs were played daily at 10:00 PM BST on the promotional website secretlife.fm.

== Musical composition ==
Secret Life is an ambient album. Fred Again performs the vocals.

It interpolates John Prine's "Summer's End" (from The Tree of Forgiveness) on "Radio" and "Come On Home". The album also interpolates Leonard Cohen's "In My Secret Life" on "Secret" and Winnie Raeder's "Don’t You Dare" on "Enough". Alongside these, Fred Again incorporates sampled vocal snippets throughout the album, akin to his Actual Life releases.

== Critical reception ==
Professional ratings
Aggregate scores
| Source | Rating |
|---|---|
| Metacritic | 59/100 |
Review scores
| Source | Rating |
| AllMusic | 3/5 stars |
| The Guardian | 2/5 stars |
| NME | 3/5 stars |
| Pitchfork | 6.0/10 |
| Tom Hull | B |

Writing for Triple J, Courtney Fry praised the composition's subtleness, stating it is a "45-minute exhale [come] just at the right time". Ted Davis of Rolling Stone said that while the album falls short of Four Tet's "most beautiful album of 2023" claim, it is still "pretty". WhyNow writer Teddy Coward highly commended Secret Life and called it a "blissfully nourishing sweep" of ambient music. In particular, he enjoyed Fred Again's vocals and the way they blended with the drone ambience.

Reviewers praised the change in style of Fred Again. Davis thought that despite his playful and gimmicky persona, the album demonstrated a more subtle side of Fred Again's music. Ellie Mullins of We Rave You called him a "musical chameleon" and lauded the dynamic between the two artists. Davis also commended the degree of Eno's creativity on Secret Life, believing it something "we haven't heard [...] in years". Conversely, Ben Beaumont-Thomas of The Guardian described the album as uninspired, demonstrating the "weaknesses" in the collaborators' producing capabilities.

According to Will Richards from NME, "The album's full power is only released though when understanding the relationship between the two artists, and what came before. For those in the know, it fills in satisfying gaps; for newcomers or Eno fans unfamiliar with Fred's work, it'd be easy to feel shut out, in spite of the immersive nature of the project."

The album featured on several weekly "best of" lists, including by Rolling Stone, Pitchfork, and Far Out. A brief review of new music for The New Zealand Herald by Peter Baker recommended this album for being "a haunting and solemn collection of atmospheric soundscapes fused with YouTube audio snippets, Instagram voice messages and Fred Again's own fragile vocals".

== Track listing ==
Secret Life track listing
| No. | Title | Writer(s) | Producer(s) | Length |
|---|---|---|---|---|
| 1. | "I Saw You" | Brian Eno; Fred Gibson | Eno; Fred Again | 4:25 |
| 2. | "Secret" | Eno; Gibson; Leonard Cohen; Sharon Robinson | Eno; Fred Again; Joy Anonymous; Leif Vollebekk | 5:04 |
| 3. | "Radio" | Eno; Gibson; Eyelar | Eno; Fred Again; Eyelar | 4:04 |
| 4. | "Follow" | Eno; Gibson | Eno; Fred Again | 1:39 |
| 5. | "Enough" | Eno; Gibson; Winnie Raeder; Buddy Ross | Eno; Fred Again; Ross | 5:22 |
| 6. | "Pause" | Eno; Gibson | Eno; Fred Again | 2:23 |
| 7. | "Safety" | Eno; Gibson; Justin Vernon | Eno; Fred Again | 2:43 |
| 8. | "Cmon" | Eno; Gibson; Lydia Clowes; Henry Counsell; Aaron Dessner; Taylor El Hage; Teresa Origone; Raeder; Benedik Toming; Leo Wyatt | Eno; Fred Again; Dessner | 5:20 |
| 9. | "Trying" | Eno; Gibson; Lola Young | Eno; Fred Again; Joy Anonymous | 3:41 |
| 10. | "Chest" | Eno; Gibson; Irving Adjei; Kissin Teef | Eno; Fred Again | 4:55 |
| 11. | "Come On Home" | Eno; Gibson; Pat McLaughlin; John Prine | Eno; Fred Again; Joy Anonymous | 4:57 |
| Total length: | | | | 44:33 |

== Personnel ==
- Fred Again – production, programming
- Brian Eno – production, programming, gatefold photograph
- Kieran Hebden – mastering

== Charts ==
Chart performance for Secret Life
| Chart (2023) | Peak position |
|---|---|
| Australian Albums (ARIA) | 84 |
| Belgian Albums (Ultratop Flanders) | 57 |
| New Zealand Albums (RMNZ) | 26 |
| UK Album Downloads (OCC) | 28 |
| UK Independent Albums (OCC) | 28 |
| US Top Dance Albums (Billboard) | 24 |
| US New Age Albums (Billboard) | 1 |
