= Jungle (Fred Again song) =

2022 song by Fred Again and Four Tet

Single by Fred Again with Four Tet & Elley Duhe featuring Elley Duhe

from the EP USB
- Released: 29 June 2022
- Length: 3:18: 3:53 (Extended Mix)
- Label: Again.; Atlantic
- Songwriters: Fred Gibson; Kieran Hebden; Elley Duhé
- Producers: Alex Gibson; Fred Again; Four Tet

Fred Again singles chronology
"Admit It (U Don't Want 2)" (2022)	"Jungle" (2022)	"Turn On the Lights Again" (2022)

"Jungle" is a song by Fred Again. It was released on 29 June 2022, through Again. and Atlantic. Co-produced by Four Tet, the song heavily samples the songs "Immortal" by Elley Duhé and "Revolution 909" by Daft Punk.

== Release ==
Prior to release, Fred Again teased the song while at festivals and on social media. It was first played on the radio when it was selected as Clara Amfo's "Hottest Record in the World". It was released in late June 2022.

== Charts ==
Chart performance for "Jungle"
Chart (2022–2023)	Peak position
Australia (ARIA)	52
Ireland (IRMA)	61
Lithuania (AGATA)	56
New Zealand Hot Singles (RMNZ)	22
UK Singles (OCC)	78
UK Dance (OCC)	32
US Hot Dance/Electronic Songs (Billboard)	28

== Certifications ==
Certifications for "Jungle"
Region	Certification	Certified units/sales
Canada (Music Canada)	Platinum	80,000^{‡}
New Zealand (RMNZ)	2× Platinum	60,000^{‡}
United Kingdom (BPI)	Gold	400,000^{‡}
^{‡} Sales+streaming figures based on certification alone.
