= Actual Life 3 (January 1 – September 9 2022) =

Studio album by Fred Again
- Released: October 28, 2022
- Recorded: 2022
- Genre: Electronic
- Length: 40:42
- Label: Atlantic
- Producer: Alex Gibson; Benjy Gibson; Fred Again; Jamie xx; Kieran Hebden; Parisi; Rob Milton

Fred Again chronology
USB (2022)	Actual Life 3 (January 1 – September 9 2022) (2022)	Secret Life (2023)

Singles from Actual Life 3 (January 1 - September 9, 2022)
- 1. "Danielle (Smile on My Face)" Released: 14 September 2022; 2. "Bleu (Better with Time)" Released: 23 September 2022; 3. "Kammy (Like I Do)" Released: 3 October 2022; 4. "Delilah (Pull Me Out of This)" Released: 17 October 2022; 5. "Clara (The Night is Dark)" Released: 27 October 2022

Actual Life 3 (January 1 – September 9 2022) is the third studio album from British producer Fred Gibson under the stage name Fred Again. It was released on October 28, 2022, through Atlantic Records. Similar to the previous two releases in the Actual Life series, Actual Life 3 incorporates samples and audio clips from existing material, such as Instagram videos. At the Grammy Awards 2024, it won Best Dance/Electronic Album and was shortlisted for the 2023 Mercury Prize.

== Critical reception ==
Professional ratings
Aggregate scores
Source	Rating
Metacritic	70/100
Review scores
Source	Rating
Clash	7/10
DIY	4/5 stars
NME	4/5 stars
Pitchfork	5.9/10

Actual Life 3 was released to positive reviews. The album featured at 19th in Double J's 50 best albums of the year. It also featured on Billboard's top 50 list, garnering 41st.

It was nominated for Album of the Year at the 2023 Brit Awards.

In the 2022 Triple J Hottest 100, two of the album's songs were featured in the countdown. "Delilah (Pull Me Out of This)" was 14th and "Danielle (Smile on My Face)" was 100th. Although Pitchfork gave the album only 5.9/10, stating that "it feels slightly indulgent."

It won the Best Dance/Electronic Music Album at the Grammy's in 2024.

== Track listing ==
Actual Life 3 (January 1 – September 9, 2022) track listing
No.	Title	Writer(s)	Producer(s)	Length
1.	"January 1st 2022"	Fred Gibson	Fred Again	0:12
2.	"Eyelar (Shutters)" (with Eyelar)	F. Gibson; Benjy Gibson; Eyelar Mirzazadeh	Fred Again; B. Gibson	3:30
3.	"Delilah (Pull Me Out of This)" (with Delilah Montagu)	F. Gibson; B. Gibson; Delilah Montagu	Fred Again; Alex Gibson; Kieran Hebden; Parisi; Skrillex^{[a]}; Tim Raben^{[a]}	4:11
4.	"Kammy (Like I Do)" (with Kamille)	F. Gibson; Camille Angelina Purcell	Fred Again; Parisi	3:59
5.	"Berwyn (All That I Got Is You)" (with Berwyn, Dermot Kennedy and Guante)	F. Gibson; Berwyn Du Bois; Dermot Kennedy; Kyle Tran Myhre	Fred Again; B. Gibson; Parisi; Rob Milton	3:41
6.	"Bleu (Better with Time)" (with Yung Bleu)	F. Gibson; B. Gibson; Jeremy Biddle; Nat Rhoads; Aubrey Graham	Fred Again; B. Gibson; Parisi	3:17
7.	"Nathan (Still Breathing)" (with Nathan Archie)	F. Gibson; B. Gibson; Marco Parisi; Nathan William Archie; Peter Fenn	Fred Again; B. Gibson; Parisi	2:44
8.	"Danielle (Smile on My Face)" (with 070 Shake)	F. Gibson; B. Gibson; M. Parisi; Giampaolo Parisi; Danielle Balbuena; Dave Hamelin; Mike Dean; Ronjae England; Sean Solymar	Fred Again; B. Gibson; Hebden; Parisi	3:21
9.	"Kelly (End of a Nightmare)" (with Wet)	F. Gibson; M. Parisi; G. Parisi; Kelly Zutrau	Fred Again; Parisi	4:17
10.	"Mustafa (Time to Move You)"	F. Gibson; Montagu; M. Parisi; G. Parisi; Myhre; Kennedy; Biddle; Rhoads; Graham; Purcell; Zutrau; Angie McMahon; Clara Ward Singers; Mustafa Ahmed	Fred Again; Parisi	2:35
11.	"Clara (The Night Is Dark)" (with Clara Ward)	F. Gibson; M. Parisi; G. Parisi; Clara Ward Singers; Seni Crofts	Fred Again; Parisi	4:38
12.	"Winnie (End of Me)"	F. Gibson; Winnie Raeder; James Smith	Fred Again; Parisi; Jamie xx	4:03
13.	"September 9th 2022"	F. Gibson	Fred Again	0:14
Total length:				40:42

Deluxe edition bonus tracks
No.	Title	Writer(s)	Producer(s)	Length
14.	"Kyren (My Son)"	F. Gibson	Fred Again	4:34
15.	"Adam (Act Like)"	F. Gibson	Fred Again	2:55
16.	"Homies" (featuring Henry Wu)	F. Gibson; Henry (Kamaal) Williams	Fred Again	3:01
17.	"Baxter (These Are My Friends)" (with Baxter Dury)	Baxter Dury; F. Gibson	Fred Again	4:04
Total length:				55:16

Notes

- All track titles are stylised with parenthetical text in all lowercase. As an example, "Eyelar (Shutters)" is stylised "Eyelar (shutters)".
- ^{^[a]} signifies an additional producer.

Sample credits

- "Delilah (Pull Me Out of This)" samples "Lost Keys" by Delilah Montagu.
- "Bleu (Better With Time)" samples "You're Mines Still" by Yung Bleu.
- "Danielle (Smile on My Face)" samples "Nice to Have" by 070 Shake.
- "Kelly (End of a Nightmare)" samples "Take Hold of Me" by Wet.
- "Clara (The Night Is Dark)" samples "The Storm is Passing Over" as performed by The Clara Ward Singers.
- "Winnie (End of Me)" samples "The End of Me" by Winnie Raeder.

== Personnel ==
Musicians

- Fred Again – programming (1–5, 7, 8, 10–13), vocals (tracks 1, 6, 9, 12)
- Benjy Gibson – programming (2, 5, 8)
- Eyelar Mirzazadeh – vocals (2)
- Parisi (Note: Marco and Giampolo Parisi are credited both as a group and as individuals throughout the track listing.) – programming (4, 7–12), bass (7, 10), synthesizer (7, 9, 11), sound effects (10), drums (11), keyboards (11)
  - Marco Parisi – bass (3), synthesizer (3, 8), programming (4), keyboards (5)
  - Giampaolo Parisi – drums (3, 8), programming (3, 4, 8), sound effects (5), bass (7, 10), synthesizer (7, 9)
- Alex Gibson – programming (3)
- Kieran Hebden – programming (3), drum programming (8)
- Delilah Montagu – vocals (3, 10)
- Kamille – vocals (4, 10)
- Rob Milton – programming (5)
- Dermot Kennedy – vocals (5, 10)
- Jeremy Biddle – vocals (6)
- Kelly Zutrau – vocals (9)
- Clara Ward Singers – vocals (10, 11)
- Jamie xx – programming (12)
- Winnie Raeder – vocals (12)

Technical

- Jay Reynolds – mastering, mixing (1, 2, 4, 6, 9–13)
- Fred Again – mastering (3, 5), mixing (5, 6, 8)
- Kieran Hebden – mastering, mixing (8)
- Peter Fenn – vocal engineering (7)

== Charts ==
=== Weekly charts ===
Weekly chart performance for Actual Life 3 (January 1 – September 9, 2022)
Chart (2022)	Peak position
Australian Albums (ARIA)	8
Austrian Albums (Ö3 Austria)	28
Belgian Albums (Ultratop Flanders)	10
Belgian Albums (Ultratop Wallonia)	57
Danish Albums (Hitlisten)	33
Dutch Albums (Album Top 100)	11
Finnish Albums (Suomen virallinen lista)	28
French Albums (SNEP)	120
German Albums (Offizielle Top 100)	27
Irish Albums (IRMA)	2
Lithuanian Albums (AGATA)	29
New Zealand Albums (RMNZ)	6
Norwegian Albums (VG-lista)	24
Scottish Albums (Official Charts)	11
Spanish Albums (Promusicae)	68
Swedish Albums (Sverigetopplistan)	48
Swiss Albums (Schweizer Hitparade)	40
UK Albums (Official Charts)	4
UK Dance Albums (Official Charts)	1
US Heatseekers Albums (Billboard)	1
US Top Dance/Electronic Albums (Billboard)	3

=== Year-end charts ===
2023 year-end chart performance for Actual Life 3 (January 1 – September 9, 2022)
Chart (2023)	Position
Belgian Albums (Ultratop Flanders)	126

2024 year-end chart performance for Actual Life 3 (January 1 – September 9, 2022)
Chart (2024)	Position
Australian Dance Albums (ARIA)	16

== Certifications ==
Region	Certification	Certified units/sales
New Zealand (RMNZ)	Gold	7,500^{‡}
United Kingdom (BPI)	Silver	60,000^{‡}
^{‡} Sales+streaming figures based on certification alone.
