= Hardkiss =

Electronic music group and record label

Hardkiss is the group moniker of San Francisco electronic music pioneers Scott (who died on March 25, 2013), Gavin, and Robbie Hardkiss. The trio formed a record label called Hardkiss Music in San Francisco in 1991. Initially promoting underground raves and dance parties where they would DJ, with Hardkiss Music they began to produce and release a catalog of vinyl records which stirred international recognition and launched DJ and production careers. Scott Hardkiss (real name Scott Friedel) worked under the pseudonym God Within. Gavin Hardkiss works under the pseudonym Hawke. Robbie Hardkiss has worked under the pseudonym Little Wing. They also released music by a myriad of other artists including Rabbit in the Moon, Symbiosis and TTauri. Their music started as a mixture of acid house music, trance music, and breakbeat techno. Hardkiss Music became a blueprint for DJ owned boutique record labels.

In 1995 Hardkiss released a compilation called Delusions of Grandeur featuring the best selections of the early vinyl releases. Delusions of Grandeur was distributed through Caroline in the US and was signed to L'Attitude on Parlophone in the UK. The album was a benchmark in the development of US electronic dance music.

Hardkiss Music stopped releasing music in 1997 in order to sign a recording deal with Columbia Records (Sony Music).

The label re-launched in 2014 to release a new Hardkiss album titled 1991.
