= Actual Life (April 14 – December 17 2020) =

Studio album by Fred Again
- Released: April 16, 2021
- Genre: Electronic
- Length: 50:27
- Label: again.. Records

Fred Again chronology
Actual Life (2020)	Actual Life (April 14 – December 17 2020) (2021)	Actual Life 2 (February 2 – October 15 2021) (2021)

Actual Life (April 14 – December 17 2020) is the debut studio album from British producer Fred Gibson under the stage name Fred Again. It was released on April 16, 2021 through again.. Records. The composition of the album involves short clips from various sources, such as YouTube videos and FaceTime conversations, layered with synthesizers. The album revolves around the COVID-19 pandemic and was an outlet for Gibson to explore "a year of finding love and mourning its loss".

The album was preceded by Actual Life, a five-track extended play released initially on May 15, 2020 featuring one song present on this album, and extended mixes of "Adam" and "Me". On Apple Music, the EP has a release date of June 12, 2020 and also includes "Marnie (Wish I Had U)".

== Critical reception ==
The album featured at 7th in Double J's 50 best albums of the year.

== Track listing ==
Disc 1
No.	Title	Length
1.	"April 14th 2020"	0:40
2.	"Kyle (I Found You)"	3:16
3.	"Dermot (See Yourself in My Eyes)" (with Dermot Kennedy)	3:48
4.	"Yasminah (See Your Face Again)"	3:05
5.	"Hackney (Interlude)"	0:14
6.	"Julia (Deep Diving)"	4:34
7.	"Adam (Interlude)"	1:45
8.	"Me (Heavy)"	3:03
9.	"Big Hen (Steal My Joy)"	4:23
10.	"Marnie (Wish I Had U)"	3:12
11.	"Sabrina (I Am a Party)"	3:19
12.	"Lydia (Please Make It Better)"	3:07
13.	"Carlos (Make It Thru)"	3:23
14.	"Angie (Interlude)"	2:48
15.	"Angie (I've Been Lost)" (featuring Angie McMahon)	4:45
16.	"December 17th 2020"	0:22

Disc 2
No.	Title	Length
1.	"Marea (We've Lost Dancing)" (with the Blessed Madonna)	4:45

== Charts ==
=== Weekly charts ===
Weekly chart performance for Actual Life (April 14 – December 17 2020)
Chart (2021–2024)	Peak position
Australian Albums (ARIA)	75
Belgian Albums (Ultratop Flanders)	41
Dutch Albums (Album Top 100)	65
UK Dance Albums (Official Charts)	9
UK Album Downloads (Official Charts)	84
US Top Dance/Electronic Albums (Billboard)	10

=== Year-end charts ===
2023 year-end chart performance for Actual Life (April 14 – December 17 2020)
Chart (2023)	Position
Belgian Albums (Ultratop Flanders)	136

2024 year-end chart performance for Actual Life (April 14 – December 17 2020)
Chart (2024)	Position
Australian Dance Albums (ARIA)	17
Belgian Albums (Ultratop Flanders)	171

== Certifications ==
Certifications for Actual Life (April 14 – December 17 2020)
Region	Certification	Certified units/sales
Denmark (IFPI Danmark)	Gold	10,000^{‡}
New Zealand (RMNZ)	Gold	7,500^{‡}
United Kingdom (BPI)	Silver	60,000^{‡}
^{‡} Sales+streaming figures based on certification alone.
