= The Blessed Madonna =

American DJ (born 1977)

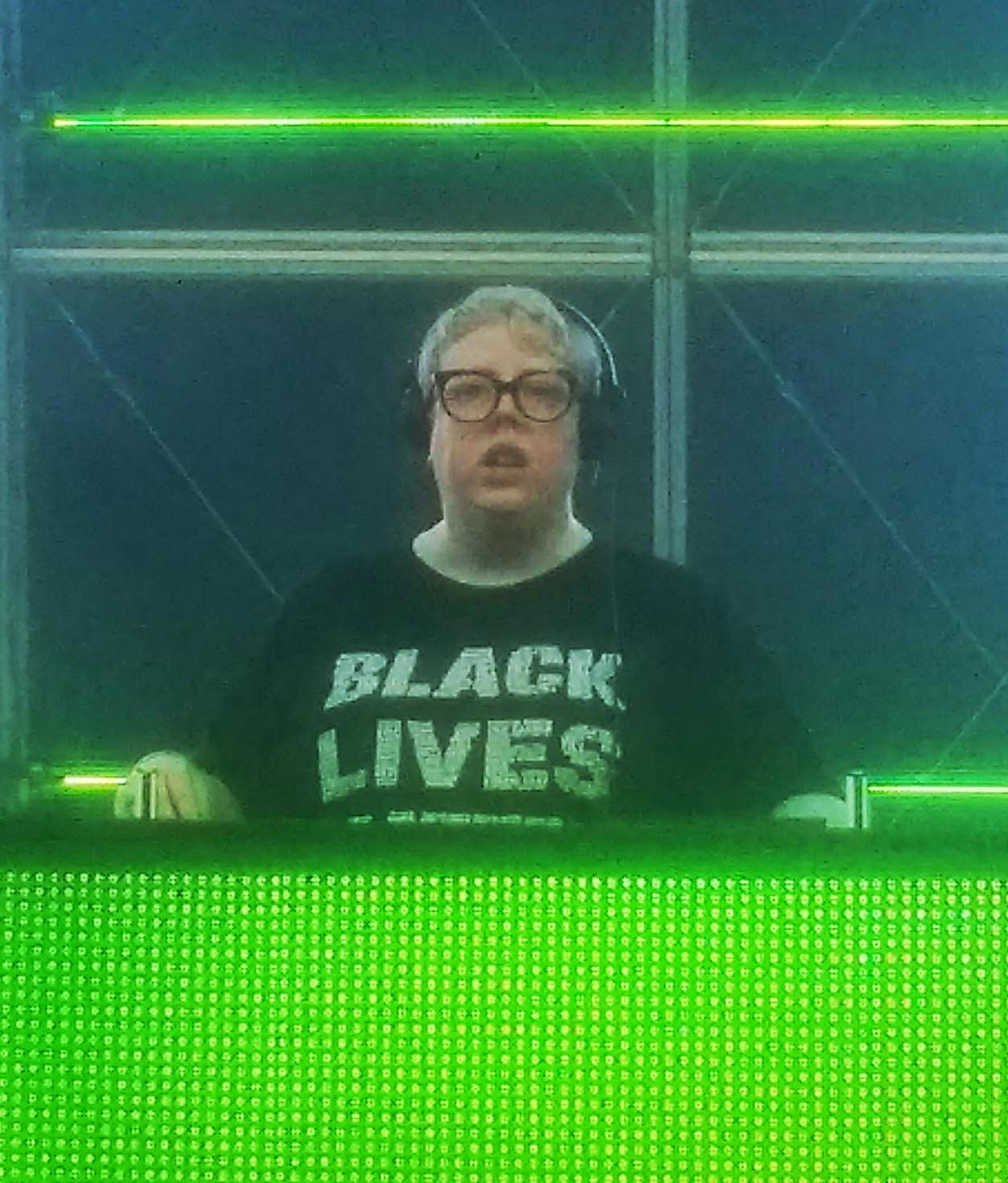
- Stamper in 2018

Background information
- Born: Marea Renee Stamper; October 22, 1977 (age 48); Kentucky, United States
- Genres: House; techno; disco
- Occupations: DJ; remixer; producer
- Instrument: Keyboards

Marea Renee Stamper (born October 22, 1977), better known by her (Note: Stamper uses she/her and they/them pronouns. This article uses she/her for consistency.) stage name The Blessed Madonna (formerly The Black Madonna), is an American DJ, producer and musician. Mixmag named her the DJ of the year in 2016. She founded her own record label called We Still Believe.

== Musical career ==
Stamper is a high-school dropout who was bullied for her gender-nonconforming appearance. She started her career in the late 1990s, selling mixtapes by underground DJs at raves. Stamper studied English at the University of Louisville and was the general manager for the college radio station.

In 2013, she released her EP Lady of Sorrows. In 2014, she released two singles, “Stay” and “Exodus”. On November 11, 2016, she released the single “He Is the Voice I Hear” at Gramaphone Records in Chicago, Illinois. The song was later released on streaming platforms through her own label, We Still Believe, in the beginning of 2017. In 2018, the Blessed Madonna appeared as herself in Grand Theft Auto Online, as part of the After Hours DLC. She has been called "one of the world's most exciting turntablists."

Stamper's former stage name, The Black Madonna, references the Black Madonna paintings of the Virgin Mary, a tribute to her family's favorite Catholic figure. Historically, Stamper defended the use of The Black Madonna, citing her Catholic faith as a reason for her attachment to the icon. However, in response to a Change.org petition that raised concerns of racial insensitivity, Stamper changed her stage name to the Blessed Madonna on July 20, 2020. She cited "controversy, confusion, pain and frustration" caused by the previous name and stated, "People who shared that devotion loved the name, but in retrospect I should have listened harder to other perspectives."

On July 27, 2020, British singer Dua Lipa announced the release of a remix by Stamper of her song "Levitating" featuring American artists Madonna and Missy Elliott to serve as the fifth single of her 2020 album, Future Nostalgia. The remix was released on August 14, 2020. On August 4, Dua Lipa announced Club Future Nostalgia, which was mixed by Stamper, and features previously announced guests Madonna and Missy Elliott, as well as Mark Ronson, Gwen Stefani, and others. In late 2021, Stamper began hosting regular shows on BBC Radio 6 Music on Saturday nights. In 2022, Stamper released the single "Serotonin Moonbeams" which featured vocals from singer Uffie, as well as a sample from Burton Inc.'s "Why Don't You Let Me Know". The track interpolated Suzanne Vega's hit song "Tom's Diner". On August 1, 2024, Stamper announced that she would be releasing her debut studio album, Godspeed, on October 11. The album was delayed a week, and was therefore released on October 18, 2024.

== Personal life ==
Stamper is bisexual, non-binary, and uses she/her and they/them pronouns. She is married to a man using the instagram username Autopilote.

== Discography ==
=== Studio albums ===
- Godspeed (2024)

=== Remix albums ===
- DGTL: The Blessed Madonna at DGTL Madrid, 2018 (2018)
- Club Future Nostalgia (2020; with Dua Lipa)
- NYE 2021 (2020)

=== Singles ===
- "He Is the Voice I Hear" (2017)
- "Levitating (The Blessed Madonna Remix)" (with Dua Lipa featuring Madonna and Missy Elliott; 2020)
- "Marea (We've Lost Dancing)" (with Fred Again; 2021)
- "Serotonin Moonbeams" (2022)
- "Shades of Love" (featuring The Joy; 2023)
- "We Still Believe" (featuring Jamie Principle; 2023)
- "Mercy" (featuring Jacob Lusk; 2023)
- "Happier" (featuring Clementine Douglas; 2023)
- "Count on My Love" (with Daniel Wilson & Kon; 2024)
- "Edge of Saturday Night" (with Kylie Minogue; 2024)

=== Selected remixes ===
- 2015: Nick Höppner – "Relate"
- 2016: Robyn – "Indestructible"
- 2016: Tiga – "Blondes Have More Fun"
- 2018: Silk City and Dua Lipa – "Electricity"
- 2019: Robyn – "Between the Lines"
- 2019: Georgia – "About Work the Dancefloor"
- 2020: Celeste – "Stop This Flame"
- 2021: Elton John and Dua Lipa – "Cold Heart (Pnau remix)"
- 2024: Ariana Grande – "Yes, And?"
- 2024: Jade Thirlwall - "Angel of My Dreams"
