= Actual Life 2 (February 2 – October 15 2021) =

Actual Life 2 (February 2 - October 15 2021)

Studio album by Fred Again
- Released: November 19, 2021
- Recorded: 2021
- Genre: Electronic
- Length: 46:35
- Label: Atlantic

Fred Again chronology
Actual Life (April 14 – December 17 2020) (2020)	Actual Life 2 (February 2 - October 15 2021) (2021)	USB (2022)

Singles from Actual Life 2 (February 2 - October 15 2021)
- 1. "Billie (Loving Arms)" Released: August 31, 2021; 2. "Hannah (The Sun)" Released: October 12, 2021; 3. "Faisal (Envelops Me)" Released: November 12, 2021

Actual Life 2 (February 2 – October 15 2021) is the second studio album from British producer Fred Gibson under the stage name Fred Again. It was released on November 19, 2021, through Atlantic Records. Similar to other releases in the Actual Life series, Actual Life 2 incorporates samples and audio clips from existing material, such as Instagram videos. The album is notable for featuring a remix of Billie Ray Martin's 1994 track "Your Loving Arms".

== Critical reception ==
The album received positive reviews in the press, with NME reviewing it four out of five stars.

== Track listing ==
Actual Life 2 (February 2 - October 15 2021) track listing
No.	Title	Length
1.	"February 2nd 2021"	0:43
2.	"Catrin (The City)"	3:26
3.	"Roze (Forgive)" (with I Am Roze)	3:49
4.	"Gigi (What You Went Through)"	3:19
5.	"Kahan (Last Year)" (with Kodak Black)	3:36
6.	"Tate (How I Feel)"	3:42
7.	"Hannah (The Sun)"	3:16
8.	"Carlos (Interlude)"	2:01
9.	"Faisal (Envelops Me)"	4:10
10.	"Tayla (Every Night)"	1:05
11.	"Tanya (Maybe Life)"	5:16
12.	"Marco (And Everyone)"	2:29
13.	"Billie (Loving Arms)"	3:37
14.	"Billie (Interlude)"	1:11
15.	"Mollie (Hear Your Name)"	4:01
16.	"October 15th 2021"	0:54

== Charts ==
Chart performance for Actual Life 2 (February 2 – October 15 2021)
Chart (2022–2023)	Peak position
Belgian Albums (Ultratop Flanders)	70
