= Fred Again =

British musician and producer (born 1993)

- Gibson performing in 2025

Background information
- Also known as: Fred
- Born: Frederick John Philip Gibson; 19 July 1993 (age 33); London, England
- Genres: UK garage; electronic; house; pop; hip hop
- Occupations: Record producer; multi-instrumentalist; singer; songwriter; remixer
- Instruments: Keyboards; synthesiser; guitar; sampler; drums; vocals
- Years active: 2010–present
- Labels: E1; Atlantic UK
- Website: fredagain.com

Frederick John Philip Gibson (born 19 July 1993), known professionally as Fred Again (stylised as Fred again..) or simply Fred, is a British record producer, singer, songwriter, multi-instrumentalist, and DJ who has worked with a range of artists, including Ed Sheeran, Stormzy, and Clean Bandit. At the 66th Annual Grammy Awards, he was nominated for Best New Artist, won Best Dance/Electronic Album for his third album Actual Life 3 (January 1 – September 9 2022) (2022), and won Best Dance/Electronic Recording for his 2023 single "Rumble" (with Skrillex and Flowdan).

Prior to his solo career, Gibson achieved commercial success as a songwriter and producer, holding credits on 30% of all UK number-one singles in 2019 and becoming the youngest artist to win Producer of the Year at the 2020 Brit Awards. He gained wider recognition for his Actual Life series, which utilizes real-world audio samples and voice memos in a "collaborative diary" format. His 2022 album Actual Life 3 was nominated for a Mercury Music Prize in 2023 and won the Grammy Award for Best Dance/Electronic Album in 2024.

In May 2023, Gibson released Secret Life, a collaborative ambient album with Brian Eno. He has headlined major international festivals including Coachella in 2023 and Reading and Leeds Festivals, and performed back-to-back DJ sets with former Daft Punk member Thomas Bangalter.

== Early life and education ==
Gibson was born on 19 July 1993 in Balham, London. He is the second son of barrister Charles Anthony Warneford Gibson (born 1960) and Mary Ann Frances Morgan. Gibson's father is descended from Huntingdonshire gentry and his mother's ancestry includes the Earls of Dundonald, the Earls of Wemyss and March, the Marquess of Crewe, the Dukes of Somerset, and other peerage and baronetage families. His mother is the eldest daughter of diplomat John Morgan and Fionn O'Neill, who was the only daughter of the marriage of British socialite Ann Charteris and Anglo-Irish aristocrat and financier Shane, 3rd Baron O'Neill. His maternal great-grandmother Ann (a noted society hostess and the granddaughter of the 11th Earl of Wemyss) remarried, firstly to the press magnate Esmond Harmsworth, 2nd Viscount Rothermere, and secondly to the writer Ian Fleming, the creator of James Bond.

From 2006 to 2011, Gibson attended Marlborough College, a private boarding school in Wiltshire.

== Career ==
=== Beginnings and record label deal ===
Aged 16, Gibson joined an a cappella group at the home of Brian Eno after being invited by a family friend. In 2014, he collaborated as co-producer and songwriter with Eno and Karl Hyde on their two project albums Someday World and High Life (songwriter only). Eno stated: "...when I first worked with Fred, I could see he was brilliant. It's very clear he is a very, very sensitive and good artist... but I didn't really understand a lot of what he was doing. It took me quite a while to think... 'oh my gosh, this is really a new idea about how you can make music.'" Also in 2014, Gibson participated in the Red Bull Music Academy in Tokyo, Japan.

Between 2015 and 2019, Gibson worked primarily as a songwriter and producer for a diverse range of mainstream artists. His early production credits included work on Roots Manuva's album Bleeds (2015) and Charli XCX's 2016 single "After the Afterparty". He went on to contribute production to Lil Yachty's 2017 track "Better" (which featured Stefflon Don), Plan B's Heaven Before All Hell Breaks Loose (2018), and BTS's "Make It Right" (2019). In 2019, he also co-produced the UK number-one single "Own It" by Stormzy, featuring Ed Sheeran and Burna Boy.

In 2018, Gibson began collaborating with singer-songwriter Maisie Peters, receiving co-writing credits on various songs of hers. He continued to write with her until 2021. In June 2018, George Ezra's song "Shotgun", co-written by Gibson, reached number one on the UK Singles Chart, remaining in the top 3 for 12 consecutive weeks from 22 June to 7 September. Later, in the same year, Gibson was also credited with co-writing "Solo" by Clean Bandit featuring Demi Lovato, and gained further success with Rita Ora's song "Let You Love Me". Gibson is credited with writing and/or producing 12 of 15 of Ed Sheeran's 2019 No.6 Collaborations Project, with credited songs featuring for a total of 14 weeks at number one in the charts.

By 2019, Gibson had achieved significant commercial success in the UK charts, contributing to 12 Top 40 singles over the course of the year. Additionally, he held songwriting or production credits on 30% of all the UK number-one singles in 2019.

Gibson won Producer of the Year at the Brit Awards 2020. He is the youngest producer to ever win the title. The win was voted for by a group of industry-wide A&R executives and was then selected by the Music Producers' Guild.

=== Actual Life and other various projects ===
In 2019, Gibson began a project titled Actual Life, in which he collects samples from various sources – such as voice memos, clips from social media, and music by other artists – and incorporates them into original tracks. Gibson released the first of these albums, titled Actual Life (April 14 – December 17 2020), in April 2021, which he described as a "collaborative diary" reflecting his life experiences during the COVID-19 pandemic. He released a follow-up, Actual Life 2 (February 2 – October 15 2021), later that year in November.

In July 2022, Gibson performed a set for Boiler Room in London, the third most-watched set on Boiler Room's YouTube Channel. The same week, he released the single "Turn On the Lights again.." with Swedish House Mafia, which samples Future's 2012 single "Turn On the Lights". In 2022, Gibson's song "Marea (We've Lost Dancing)" was featured in Ruben Östlund's Palme d'Or-winning film Triangle of Sadness.

Gibson's third solo studio album, Actual Life 3 (January 1 – September 9 2022), was released on 28 October 2022. It was preceded by five singles: "Danielle (Smile on My Face)", "Bleu (Better with Time)", "Kammy (Like I Do)", "Delilah (Pull Me Out of This)" and "Clara (The Night Is Dark)".

Gibson's debut tour, which ran between October 2022 and February 2023 stopped in Europe, America, New Zealand and Australia. Prior to this tour, he had done sporadic pop-up shows and festivals starting in late 2021, such as the above-mentioned Boiler Room and going B2B with Swedish House Mafia.

On 4 January 2023, Gibson and Skrillex released their collaboration "Rumble" featuring Flowdan. Following this, Fred, Skrillex, and Four Tet played three more shows from 5–7 January across different London venues. On 18 February 2023, Gibson played at a sold-out Skrillex show alongside Four Tet at New York City's Madison Square Garden. Having announced the performance in the same week as the show, the trio played a warmup set in Times Square the day before. On 10 April 2023, Gibson appeared on NPR's Tiny Desk Concerts. On 24 April 2023, he, alongside Skrillex and Four Tet, played the final set of Coachella after being listed on the lineup as "TBA", a last-minute addition following the departure of Frank Ocean. On 23 June 2023, Gibson made his first appearance at Glastonbury Festival.

On 8 December 2023, Gibson released "Leavemealone" featuring Baby Keem. On 28 February 2024, Gibson released "Stayinit" featuring Lil Yachty and Overmono. On 31 May 2024, Gibson and Anderson .Paak released "Places to Be" featuring Chika.

On 18 July 2024, Gibson teased a new album in an Instagram post. He later on revealed the release of a new album, Ten Days, featuring the likes of Skrillex, Duskus, Four Tet, Anderson .Paak, Sampha and more. The album was released on 6 September 2024.

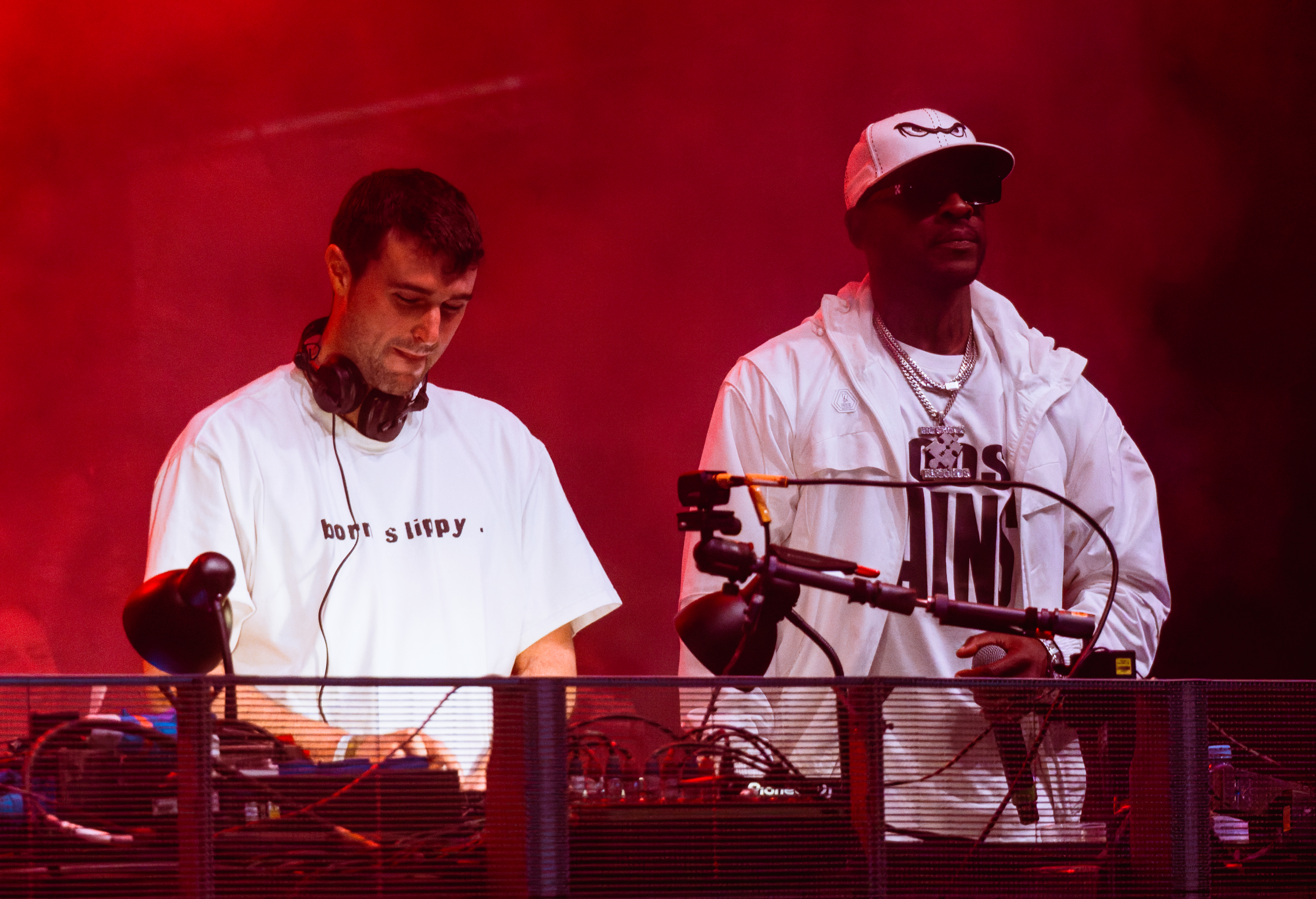
Fred Again performing with Skepta in 2025

On 17 August 2024, he played at Lowlands Festival in the Netherlands, and on 24 August 2024, he headlined Reading Festival..

On 13 December 2024, he released a pair of singles, as an expansion to Ten Days, titled "Two More Days". These singles were "light dark light" featuring Angie McMahon and "little mystery" featuring John Martyn. On 17 June 2025, he released "Victory Lap" featuring Skepta and PlaqueBoyMax. The song spawned a series of four remixes, featuring rappers That Mexican OT, Denzel Curry, Hanumankind, D Double E, and LYNY.

In August 2025, he released four singles, namely, "Back 2 Back", "21 Years", "Last 1s Left", and "London", all of whom featured Skepta, as part of his ongoing USB project. On 3 October 2025, he released "You're a Star" featuring Amyl and the Sniffers as part of his ongoing USB project.

USB002 Tour (2025)

The USB002 Tour was a concert tour Gibson staged as part of the rollout of his project USB002. The tour ran from 3 October to 12 December 2025 and consisted of ten performances across ten cities, spread over ten weeks (with one scheduled break). Each tour stop was accompanied by the release of at least one track from USB002, often featuring collaborators who also appeared during the live performances. All shows were conducted under a phone-free policy.

| Week | Date(s) | City | Country | Venue | Track(s) released (artist) |
|---|---|---|---|---|---|
| 1 | 3 October 2025 | Glasgow | Scotland | Scottish Events Campus | "You're a Star" (Fred again.. & Amyl and the Sniffers) |
| 2 | 10 October 2025 | Brussels | Belgium | Gare Maritime | "OGdub" (Fred again.., Parisi, Beam & Danny Brown) |
| 3 | 17 October 2025 | Madrid | Spain | IFEMA Madrid | "The Floor (Fred again.. Remix)" (Fred again.. & Skin On Skin); "The Floor (Skin On Skin Remix)" (Fred again.. & Skin On Skin) |
| 4 | 24 October 2025 | Lyon | France | Halle Tony Garnier | "Facilita" (Fred again.. & Caribou); "Ambery" (Fred again.. & Floating Points) |
| 5 | 30–31 October 2025 | Dublin | Ireland | The Button Factory (pop-up); RDS Simmonscourt | "Hardstyle 2" (Fred again.., Kettama & Shady Nasty); "Talk of the Town" (Fred again.., Sammy Virji & Reggie) |
| - | 7 November 2025 | Scheduled break (no concert) | — | — | No performances (scheduled break); "Beto’s Horns" (Fred again.., Ca7riel & Paco Amoroso) |
| 6 | 14–15 November 2025 | Toronto | Canada | YZD Hangar 5 | No new track released |
| 7 | 21 November 2025 | Chicago | United States | Navy Pier Events Center | "Winny" (Fred again.., Sammy Virji & Winny) |
| 8 | 28 November 2025 | Vancouver | Canada | Vancouver Convention Centre | "Icey.." (Fred again.. & Bia); "Feisty.." (Fred again.. & Bia) |
| 9 | 5 December 2025 | San Francisco | United States | Cow Palace | "solo" (Fred again.. & Blanco) |
| 10 | 12 December 2025 | Mexico City | Mexico | Expo Santa Fe | "I Luv U" (Fred again.. & Wallfacer) |

== Discography ==
Studio albums

- Actual Life (April 14 – December 17 2020) (2021)
- Actual Life 2 (February 2 – October 15 2021) (2021)
- Actual Life 3 (January 1 – September 9 2022) (2022)
- Ten Days (2024)

Collaborative albums

- Secret Life (with Brian Eno) (2023)
- 9 Months & 50 Hours (with Latin Mafia) (2026)

== Awards and nominations ==
| Award | Year | Category | Nominated work | Result | Ref. |
|---|---|---|---|---|---|
| American Music Awards | 2026 | Best Dance/Electronic Artist | Himself | Nominated | |
| A&R Awards | 2018 | Songwriter of the Year | Fred again.. | Nominated | |
| A&R Awards | 2023 | Producer of the Year | Fred again.. | Nominated | |
| A&R Awards | 2023 | Songwriter of the Year | Fred again.. | Nominated | |
| A&R Awards | 2023 | Song of the Year | "Adore U" (with Obongjayar) | Nominated | |
| Brit Awards | 2020 | Producer of the Year | Fred again.. | Won | |
| Brit Awards | 2022 | Best Dance Act | Fred again.. | Nominated | |
| Brit Awards | 2023 | Album of the Year | Actual Life 3 (January 1 – September 9 2022) | Nominated | |
| Brit Awards | 2023 | Artist of the Year | Fred again.. | Nominated | |
| Brit Awards | 2023 | Best Dance Act | Fred again.. | Nominated | |
| Brit Awards | 2024 | Artist of the Year | Fred again.. | Nominated | |
| Brit Awards | 2024 | Best Dance Act | Fred again.. | Nominated | |
| DJ Mag | 2022 | Best Live Act | Fred again.. | Won | |
| Grammy Awards | 2021 | Best Dance/Electronic Recording | "Both of Us" (as producer and mixer) | Nominated | |
| Grammy Awards | 2022 | Song of the Year | "Bad Habits" (as songwriter) | Nominated | |
| Grammy Awards | 2024 | Best New Artist | Fred again.. | Nominated | |
| Grammy Awards | 2024 | Best Dance/Electronic Album | Actual Life 3 (January 1 – September 9 2022) | Won | |
| Grammy Awards | 2024 | Best Dance/Electronic Recording | "Strong" (with Romy) | Nominated | |
| Grammy Awards | 2024 | Best Dance/Electronic Recording | "Rumble" (with Skrillex featuring Flowdan) | Won | |
| Grammy Awards | 2025 | Best Dance/Electronic Recording | "Leavemealone" (with Baby Keem) | Nominated | |
| Grammy Awards | 2026 | Best Dance/Electronic Recording | "Victory Lap" (with PlaqueBoyMax and Skepta) | Nominated | |
| Grammy Awards | 2026 | Best Dance/Electronic Album | Ten Days | Nominated | |
| Libera Awards | 2022 | Best Dance Record | "Stay High again.." (Fred again.. & Joy Anonymous Remix) | Nominated | |
| Libera Awards | 2023 | Best Dance Record | "Strong" (with Romy) | Nominated | |
| Mercury Prize | 2023 | Best Album | Actual Life 3 (January 1 – September 9 2022) | Nominated | |
| Ivor Novello Awards | 2016 | Best Contemporary Song | "Cargo" (with Roots Manuva) | Nominated | |
| Ivor Novello Awards | 2019 | PRS for Music Most Performed Work | "Shotgun" (as songwriter) | Nominated | |
| Ivor Novello Awards | 2021 | Best Song Musically and Lyrically | "Gang" (with Headie One) | Nominated | |
| Ivor Novello Awards | 2022 | Best Contemporary Song | "Don't Judge Me" (with FKA twigs and Headie One) | Nominated | |
| Ivor Novello Awards | 2022 | PRS for Music Most Performed Work | "Bad Habits" (as songwriter) | Won | |
| Ivor Novello Awards | 2023 | PRS for Music Most Performed Work | "Bad Habits" (as songwriter) | Nominated | |
| Ivor Novello Awards | 2024 | Best Contemporary Song | "Enough" (with Brian Eno) | Nominated | |
| UK Music Video Awards | 2020 | Best Hip Hop/Grime/Rap Video – UK | "Gang" (with Headie One) | Nominated | |
| UK Music Video Awards | 2021 | Best Dance/Electronic Video – Newcomer | "Dermot (See Yourself in My Eyes)" | Nominated | |
| UK Music Video Awards | 2021 | Best Choreography in a Video | "Don't Judge Me" (with FKA twigs & Headie One) | Nominated | |
| UK Music Video Awards | 2024 | Best Dance/Electronic Video – UK | "stayinit" (with Lil Yachty & Overmono) | Nominated | |
| UK Music Video Awards | 2024 | Best Live Video | "Places to Be" (with Anderson .Paak & Chika) | Won | |
| The Streamer Awards | 2025 | Best Streamed Collab | Plaqueboymax x Fred Again | Nominated | |
