= Brave (Joyryde album) =

Studio album by Joyryde
- Released: 3 April 2020
- Recorded: 2017–2020
- Genres: Bass house; trap; grime; UK bass; hip hop
- Length: 66:16
- Label: Hard Recs
- Producer: John Ford

Singles from Brave
- 1. "I'm Gone" Released: 22 February 2019; 2. "Yuck" Released: 22 March 2019; 3. "Madden" Released: 23 August 2019; 4. "Selecta 19" Released: 4 October 2019

Brave is the debut studio album by English DJ and producer Joyryde, also known as John Ford. It was released by Hard Recs on 3 April 2020. The album consists of 18 songs and features guest appearances from Mika Means, NoLay, Majilla, Youngs Teflon, Fze, and Gold. "Damn" is included as a bonus track, which features Freddie Gibbs.

Brave incorporates five distinct genres of bass house, trap, hip hop, grime, and UK bass. The themes of it reflect Ford's passion for music, energy, attitudes, and culture. Four songs were released as singles in 2019: "I'm Gone", "Yuck", which features Gold, "Madden", and "Selecta 19". Fans believed that "Agen Wida", Joyryde's collaboration with Skrillex, was the album's lead single; the ultimate release of "I'm Gone" as the first single disproved this.

Originally intended to be an extended play, Brave was expanded into an album while Ford was recovering from surgery. He wrote and finished several songs around the time of coping with drug withdrawals as he stopped taking his prescribed nerve damage medication. The album was set for a late-November 2018 release but was delayed indefinitely due to technical reasons. In early March 2020, 17 months after the original release date, Joyryde announced that he had finished production.

Brave received positive reviews from music critics, who noted the attention to quality, detail, and sound design, while a few said that every song had a unique identity. Before its release, the album was listed by multiple online music magazines as one of the most anticipated albums of 2020. "I'm Gone" was selected as one of the best dance songs of 2019 and was voted as the Best Original Track (Solo) of 2019 in the Bass House/G-House/Bassline category by the r/EDM subreddit.

== Background ==
In October 2018, Joyryde uploaded a photo to his Instagram account of record label Owsla's logo. The record label's signee Skrillex later posted a screenshot that teased a collaborative track with Joyryde. The song, titled "Agen Wida", also appeared to be part of an album. Owsla released the song as a single on 19 October 2018. Soon after announcing "Agen Wida", Joyryde announced his debut studio album Brave; the release date was revealed as 30 November 2018.

In late-November 2018, Joyryde delayed Brave indefinitely due to "mostly technical reasons" and "video deadlines and material clearance things". He announced the delay on Twitter three days prior to the album's planned release date. Nearly three months later, on 9 February 2019, Joyryde announced that he would release the lead single from Brave that month. This confused fans, as some believed that "Agen Wida" was the first single due to Joyryde having announced it alongside the album.

The song "I'm Gone" was released as the lead single from Brave on 22 February 2019. The song was released via Hard Recs, which is a subsidiary of the concert brand of the same name. The release being through the record label confirmed that the album would not be released via Owsla, reaffirming that "Agen Wida" would not be featured on Brave. Joyryde posted a teaser video to social media in early March 2020, showing the album's tracklist. The video did not reveal any song titles or featured artists, but it confirmed Brave would feature 17 tracks, the same number John Ford had released in total under the Joyryde alias at the time.

== Production and composition ==
=== Recording ===
While Ford was writing an extended play, a disk in his lower back collapsed and he underwent surgery. He had to take opioids and nerve damage medication to cope with the pain and said that he did not feel like himself during this time period. The medication brought on hallucinations and suicidal thoughts, among other mental issues, and put Ford into a state of mind that left him unable to finish the EP. He thought that it would be a long time before he could release music again. Ford attempted to write music in his studio, but later could not remember coming up with some of the songs and ideas during these sessions. He tried to get off the medication to improve his mental state, but suffered from the shakes, drug withdrawals, insomnia, and general pain. Ford finished one song during this time, then two more a week later. On 5 March 2020, 16 months after the album's initial release date, Joyryde announced that he had finished production on Brave.

=== Music and lyrics ===
Brave explores the genres of house, trap, hip hop, grime, and UK bass. Ford wrote Brave as a way to express his passion for music, energy, attitudes, and culture. He did not feel like he was Joyryde, instead conveying the analysis as a mood or style he fights to find while working in his studio. Ford went on to say that a lot went into the album and it was not for him to determine whether it is good, though he wanted Brave to be good. Ford concluded by saying the album was what Joyryde deserved. Joyryde makes use of vocals from featured artists and vocal samples on the songs "On Fire", "Got Real", "Fail Me", "Arteries", "I'm Gone", "Brooklyn", "4AM", "RTTB", and "Damn".

"I'm Gone" is a house and trap song that was produced by Ford when he was medicated with opioid pills after his surgery; he had no memory of writing some parts of the song as an effect. Ford felt his mental health was deteriorating while producing the song. He said: "I'm grateful to have music and Joyryde in my life because that's what pulled me back into the strongest version of myself I've ever been". The song features aggressive female rap vocals, based on a danceable melody and synth structure, piano progressions and orchestral strings.

The track "Yuck" is a mix of hip hop, bass and trap music, and features rapping by Gold over 808s. Joyryde was impressed by Gold's vocals, tweeting that it was "like if he in the room with me". The song makes use of trap drum chops rather than Joyryde's usual four-on-the-floor time signature and the second-half layers a series of vintage talking samples over the top. In an interview with Earmilk during the Electric Daisy Carnival festival in Japan, Ford said that Gold's lyrics worked seamlessly with the original track without any effort. He estimated that only nine hours were spent working on the song and had left the majority of Brave untouched; Ford did not want to overproduce the song as he knew it would "become lame" if he did so. The track "Madden"", samples Method Man's "Release Yo' Delf" (1994) as part of its intro, layered alongside house music plucks before a breakdown. The song is a mix of bass house and hip hop, with it making use of complementary vocals and basslines. The Wolf Of Wall Street and the Lamborghini Countach heavily inspired the song.

"Selecta 19" is a bass house song that is set in a four-on-the-floor dance floor arrangement, with a tempo of 132 beats per minute. The song's low-end-focused basslines are arranged over a topline melody with obnoxious vocals. Ford thought the original version of "Selecta 19" was good, though felt a responsibility to improve upon it. He experimented by making the song sound worse, de-polishing and leading to it sounding more "raw". Ford did not want to have a lot of elements in the song, as it could become confusing. After completing the song, he felt the released production was the best version even if it was "architected to be worst sounding".

== Release and promotion ==
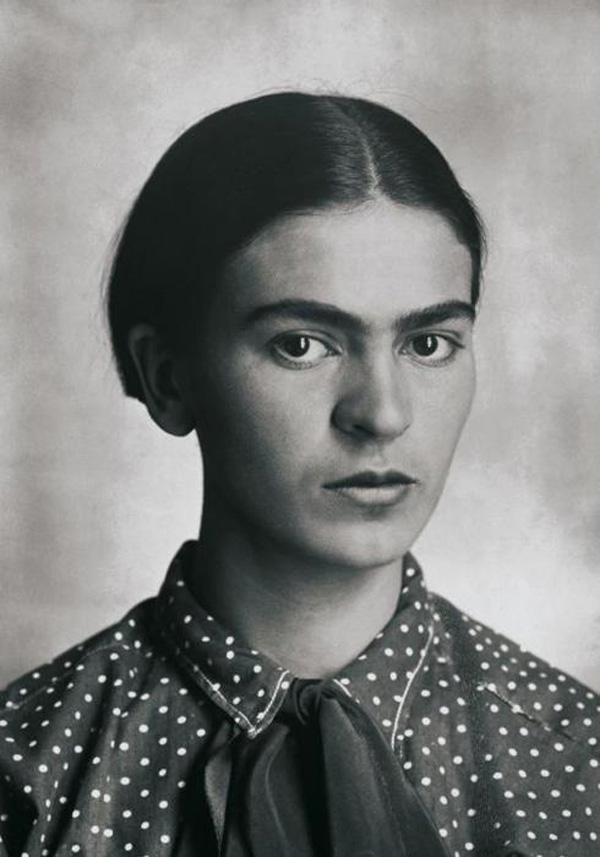
Brave's album artwork features an X-ray of Frida Kahlo (pictured).

Joyryde announced the release date for Brave on 17 March 2020 via social media; he confirmed its release date to be on 3 April, through Hard Recs. The album, which Matthew Meadow of Your EDM described as "definitely one of the most-anticipated" releases of 2020, was slated to be released 15 months after its originally scheduled November 2018 release date. Joyryde revealed that Brave contained 17 tracks in a video he posted the week before the album's announcement, though it was unclear whether there would be any further singles before the official release. Brave was made available for pre-saving on 17 March 2020. The album was released for digital download and streaming on the scheduled date, containing 18 songs, with Joyryde's 2016 Freddie Gibbs collaborative single "Damn" being featured as a bonus track. Shortly before the release of Brave, Ford played an exclusive DJ mix for the 239th episode of Apple Music's OneMix radio station. The mix was composed of unreleased songs by Ford and songs by other artists, such as Tchami, Malaa, Eprom, Skrillex, and Carnage. It was later uploaded to SoundCloud unofficially by a fan. The cover art for Brave features an X-ray of Mexican painter Frida Kahlo, taken following a bus accident she suffered at age 18.

=== Singles ===
Four singles from Brave were released— the first being "I'm Gone", which was released as the lead single on 22 February 2019. In October 2018, an early version of the song had surfaced online, but it was later updated and cleaned up for the official release. The single was marked as the first official release by Hard Recs, launching the record label. Pasquale Rotella—the head of Hard Rec's parent company Insomniac—said he was excited about the launch of the record label and believed that Joyryde was the "perfect person to kick things off". Joyryde's previous song, "Agen Wida", was thought to have been released as the lead single from the album; the release of "I'm Gone" clarified this to not be the case. The latter's contrast of emotional orchestral sections with "aggressive words and violent bass house frame" was described by Christina Hernandez of Dancing Astronaut as a depiction of Joyryde's "inner turmoil in a club-friendly way". Billboard's Kat Bein called "I'm Gone" a "mood-shifting" and "mind-bending" song that explores the mix of classical and urban styles, praising Joyryde's sound design.

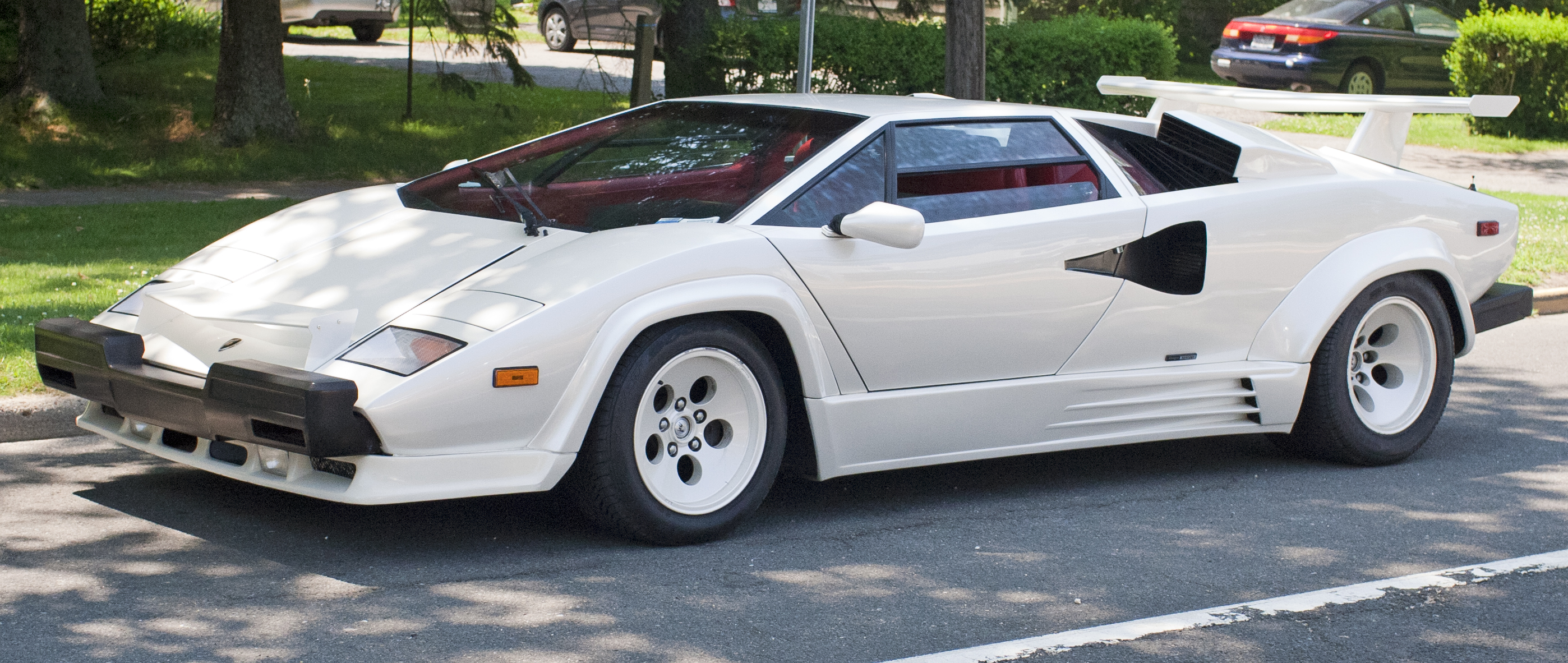
Joyryde featured two Lamborghini Countachs during his Hollywood Palladium live set.

"Yuck" was released as the second single from Brave on 22 March 2019, with a feature from rapper Gold. Bein described the song as an example of Joyryde's signature style of house music combined with trap music and hip-hop. She also highlighted Gold's vocals as standing out from the rest of the song's composition. Your EDM's Karlie Powell complimented the use of various bass music genres alongside trap and hip-hop; she said "any listener with a trained ear" would be "able to pinpoint" Joyryde's distinctive style. Bella Bagshaw, writing for Dancing Astronaut, called "Yuck" one of Joyryde's "most lurid releases to date". She said that Gold's delivery solidified "the track's shadow-dwelling lifeblood" with the message to remain devoted to one's artistic endeavour for maintaining a sense of individualism. Peach Gallagher from Run The Trap praised the single, writing that Joyryde's "god-like production skills" turn "the party into a riot".

On 23 August 2019, Joyryde released "Madden" as the album's third single. The song had been played during Joyryde's various live shows before its release. Ford said that after seeing The Wolf of Wall Street, he wanted to do something with a Lamborghini Countach. On 26 July 2019, Joyryde featured two Countachs during his live set at the Hollywood Palladium in Los Angeles. The energetic single, as described by Max Chung of Run The Trap, is a song that features Joyryde's signature "mayhem" with "classic house plucks and unique vocals". Meadow wrote about the "UK flair" being mixed with the song's bass house and hip hop composition, stating it is something that only Joyryde has been able to master. He continued, saying the song was sure to be another classic in Joyryde's repertoire.

The release of Brave's fourth single "Selecta 19" was delayed from its originally planned 3 May 2019 release. Joyryde explained that he decided to postpone the release of the song because he did not like "the sound of a few parts in it". The announcement was posted to Instagram the day before the song's scheduled release. The song was ultimately released as a single on 4 October 2019. Ford wrote in a social media post that he wanted to make a "no ego, fun, jump-up, good-vibe" song to add a contrast to the album. Writing for EDM.com, Sarah Kocur said that "Selecta 19" captured Joyryde's "true essence" and noted that it was one of the most praised songs to be released from his live sets. Omar Serrano of Run The Trap also noted the presence of the song in Joyryde's DJ mixes, saying it gets "any crowd riled up". Serrano further described how the song's vocals and basslines "team up to create an absolute nasty cut".

=== Music video ===
The music video for the track "Thrill" debuted on 14 April 2020, through Joyryde's YouTube channel. Directed by James Mackel, the video shows two lovers wreaking havoc in a Bonnie and Clyde-Esque storyline, featuring chase scenes with police and federal agents. The production of the music video was inspired by a quote on Majilla's Facebook page, which said: "sometimes you gotta play the villain". The music video includes a tribute to Rob Lyfe—the actor that played the lead male—who had died six months before the release.

== Critical reception ==
Critical response to Brave from music critics was positive. Bein praised the album highly, calling it a "monster" of an album that is "complex, hard, beautiful, dreamy, bass-fueled, chaotic and crunchy as hell". She called "Fail Me" the best song, noting its "whiplash beats and inspirational message". Rachel Narozniak of Dancing Astronaut commended the album for its "mythical quality" and said it had lived up to the anticipation, while commenting that the songs were characterized by Joyryde's signature bass house style. Powell praised the album, writing that there was "never a dull moment" on it and each song shows the "immaculate sound design and fierce attention to detail" Joyryde put into the album. In her review of the album for EDM Identity, Raven Wright called Brave a masterpiece, citing its "variety of sounds and identities" throughout each song. Wright said "Brooklyn" was her personal favourite song, saying she would "probably lose it when I'm able to hear it live".

Multiple online magazines included Brave on lists of albums to look forward to. Your EDM and Run The Trap wrote about the album on their respective lists for expected album releases in 2019 and 2020. Both lists mentioned its delayed release dates. Billboard included Brave on one of their ten "electronic albums we're thankful are coming soon" lists in an article published in late March 2020.

"I'm Gone" was awarded several online awards and titles. It was selected as one of the best dance songs of 2019 by Billboard, with the staff noting the "exploration of classical chords, bass house grooves and assaultive breakbeat rhythms; a patchwork collage of sounds, moods and textures". Additionally, the song won Best Original Track (Solo) in the Bass House/G-House/Bassline category on the Best of 2019, voted for by the r/EDM subreddit.

== Track listing ==
All tracks written and produced by Joyryde, except where noted.

Track listing for Brave
No.	Title	Writer(s)	Length
1.	"Pre Op"		0:42
2.	"On Fire"		3:23
3.	"Got Real" (featuring Mika Means)	Ford; Mika Means	4:32
4.	"I Slay" (featuring NoLay)	Ford; Isabella Gotti	3:16
5.	"Fail Me"		5:11
6.	"Thrill" (featuring Majilla)	Ford; Majilla	3:37
7.	"Focus" (Featuring Fze)	Ford; Fze	4:04
8.	"Arteries" (featuring Youngs Teflon)	Ford; Youngs Teflon	3:24
9.	"I'm Gone"		4:45
10.	"Brooklyn"		4:42
11.	"Madden"		3:46
12.	"4AM"		4:29
13.	"RTTB"		3:32
14.	"Selecta 19"		4:10
15.	"Milk" (Featuring Fze)	Ford; Fze	2:41
16.	"Yardie"		3:12
17.	"Yuck" (Featuring Gold)	Ford; Gold	3:00
18.	"Damn" (Featuring Freddie Gibbs)	Ford; Freddie Gibbs	3:40
Total length:			1:06:16

Notes

- All tracks are stylised in all caps.
- "Damn" was released as a bonus track.

== Personnel ==
Credits adapted from Tidal.

Technical and composing credits

- John Ford – production, writing (all tracks)
- Tamika Means – writing (3)
- Natalie Athanasiou – writing (4)
- Kathryn Renee Sanders – writing (6)
- Mark Anthony Wendell – writing (6)
- Roger Montgomery III – writing (7, 15)
- Jimmy Conway – writing (8)
- Kawaun Malik Spruill Saunders – writing (17)
- Fredrick Jamel Tipton – writing (18)

== Release history ==
Release dates and formats for Brave
Region	Date	Format	Label	Ref.
Various	3 April 2020	Digital download	Hard Recs	
