= I'm Gone (Joyryde song) =

Single by Joyryde

from the album Brave
- Released: 22 February 2019
- Recorded: 2018–2019
- Genre: Bass house; trap
- Length: 4:45
- Label: Hard Recs
- Songwriter: John Ford
- Producer: John Ford

Joyryde singles chronology
| "Agen Wida" (2019) | "I'm Gone" (2019) | "Yuck" (2019) |

"I'm Gone" (stylised as "IM GONE") is a song by English DJ and producer JOYRYDE. It was released on 22 March 2019 by American record label Hard Recs. The song was featured as part of JOYRYDE's debut album, Brave.

== Background and release ==
The song was written while JOYRYDE was recovering from surgery while on opioid pills. In an interview with Billboard Dance, JOYRYDE spoke about writing the song while in the process of recovering, stating:

"I started it while recovering from back surgery on maximum strength opioid pills. Some parts I don't remember writing. On those days, I realised what it was like to feel my mental health slipping. I'm grateful to have music and JOYRYDE in my life because that's what pulled me back into the strongest version of myself I've ever been. When I saw the light at the end of the recovery, it forced the rest of the album out of me. I've never been more attached to something that wasn't alive."

— Joyryde talking about the song and its highly personal roots.

On 19 February 2019, JOYRYDE announced the release date of the lead single for his debut album Brave as 22 February. The song was initially leaked in October 2018 and was released on 22 February 2019; four months after JOYRYDE's previous song "Agen Wida". The song was released as the first single of JOYRYDE's debut album, Brave. The song also was marked as the debut release of Hard Recs, a subsidiary of the North American-based music festival and concert brand Hard.

Although JOYRYDE's previous song and collaboration with American record producer Skrillex "Agen Wida" was initially planned to be the first single released from JOYRYDE's debut album Brave, it was later revealed that the song would not be featured on the album and that "I'm Gone" would be the first single released from the album. It was also announced that the then-upcoming album would not be released on Skrillex's record label Owsla and would instead be released on Hard Recs.

== Critical reception ==
"I'm Gone" was well received by most critics. Kat Bein of Billboard praised the song, calling JOYRYDE's bass house style as "no throwaway trend rush", further describing it as a "rich tapestry of textured noise, booming rumbles and emotional melodies." Writing for EDM.com, Katie Stone wrote that the song acted as an "expert show of Ford's production skills", further adding that JOYRYDE "intricately layers melancholic piano and strings with funky breakbeats and fierce vocals." Run the Trap's Peach Gallagher called the song an "oddly perfect dichotomy of house and trap music", further describing it as a song that "bursts with undeniable energy before dipping deep into hard-hitting basslines and building back into a rambunctious banger." Brian Bonavoglia of DJ Times praised the song, writing that JOYRYDE "showcases his production prowess with a high-octane audio assault taking listeners on a rollercoaster ride of a listening experience featuring melancholic piano and strings alongside striking vocals." Writing for EDM Identity, James Dutta writes that JOYRYDE maintained his signature style with the song, describing the style as one that incorporates "hip-hop vocal elements, with a thumping bass-line and some of the catchiest melodies around." River Beats' Sean Schmidt wrote that the song became "darker and harder" as the song progresses, further noting the song as "unique and catchy".

== Track listing ==
Digital download – Single
| No. | Title | Length |
|---|---|---|
| 1. | "I'm Gone" | 4:45 |
| Total length: | | 4:45 |

== Release history ==
| Region | Date | Format | Label | Ref. |
|---|---|---|---|---|
| Worldwide | 22 February 2019 | Digital download | Hard Recs | |
