= Agen Wida =

Single by Joyryde and Skrillex
- Released: 19 October 2018
- Genre: Bass house; trap
- Length: 3:19
- Label: Owsla
- Songwriters: Joyryde; Skrillex
- Producers: John Ford; Sonny John Moore

Joyryde singles chronology
"New Breed" (2017)	"Agen Wida" (2018)	"I'm Gone" (2019)

Skrillex singles chronology
"GOH" (2018)	"Agen Wida" (2018)	"Face My Fears" (2019)

"Agen Wida" (stylised as "AGEN WIDA") is a song by English DJ and producer Joyryde and American record producer Skrillex. It was released on 19 October 2018 by American record label Owsla.

== Background and release ==
On 1 October 2018, Joyryde posted a teaser image on Twitter with the caption "I've never done this before... I'm ready now", later confirming a collaboration with American producer Skrillex titled "Agen Wida", planned to be released on 19 October, alongside the confirmation of his debut album Brave and its release date as 30 November. On 8 October, Skrillex posted a photo on Twitter, showing the collaboration being played in iTunes and later released a video teaser of the song on Instagram.

The song was released on 19 October 2018, more than a year and a half after Joyryde's previous song "I Ware House". As of 8 January 2019, the song has accumulated over 4 million plays on music streaming service Spotify.

The song was planned as the first single of Joyryde's debut album, Brave, which was due to release on 30 November 2018. The album was later delayed for an unknown amount of time due to "mostly technical reasons" such as "video deadlines and material clearance things." On 22 February 2019, Joyryde released "I'm Gone" as the debut single from his album, meaning that "Agen Wida" would not be featured on the album. "I'm Gone" was released by Hard Recs, a record label owned by American music festival brand Hard.

== Critical reception ==
"Agen Wida" was well received by most critics. Koury Angelo of Billboard described the song as "some special kind of gnarly", further writing that the song opened "with a solid, danceable beat, ramps fast with tribal hand drums and wild monkey caws, sinks its teeth with undeniable funk only to blow your mind with absolutely untamed beat bangs by 1:17." Writing for Nest HQ, Molly Hankins called it a long-awaited collaboration between Joyryde and Skrillex, calling it a "supremely satisfying, industrial garage-house track not for the adrenaline fatigued." Bella Bagshaw of Dancing Astronaut noted the song as having a "jungle-themed savour", writing "With its spontaneous tempo switch-ups, offbeat vocal contortions, and delectably danceable four-on-the-floor framework, the collaborative delivery behind "Agen Wida" is a lesson in organic chemistry."

Several electronic music reviewers and critics praised the fusion of Joyryde's and Skrillex's respective styles. Complex's Joshua Espinoza called the song as a "solid showcase of the DJ/producers' respective styles", stating "orchestral swells, energetic bass line, and insane trap drops provide a unique sound that is equal parts aggressive and infectious." Writing for EDM.com, Nick Yopko described the song as a product of "Skrillex's astounding sound design and Joyryde's fresh approach to bass music", further writing "Skrillex's iconic chopped vocals alongside Joyryde's futuristic bass house sound creates an intense, fluctuating groove that will keep listeners on their toes." EDM Sauce's Erik Mahal noted the song's blend of the style from both artists, stating "In Joyryde's signature style of bass house, and Skrillex's out of the box production techniques, "Agen Wida" is the perfect synthesis of styles from its creators."

== Luca Lush Remix ==
On 19 December 2018, American DJ and remixer Luca Lush, released his remix of "Agen Wida". The remix was self-released by Luca Lush for free as a digital download via his SoundCloud, with the producer commenting in the track description "did u know that the time machine in doc's DeLorean from Back to the Future was actually just the world's first vape. happy holidays from ya boy." The remix was released shortly before Luca Lush's Another Life tour, beginning in January 2019.

Ria Qi of Noiseporn noted Luca Lush's experimentation with the remix, describing the second drop as a mix of jungle house and drum and bass elements and calling his remix as a showcase of his "complete disregard for genres." Writing for RaverRafting, Chad Downs commented on the perspective of the remix, noting its display of "filthy hybrid-trap drops and fast-paced drum and bass rhythms", finalising his review with "Luca Lush's take on "Agen Wida" is sure to receive as much applause as the original." Run The Trap's Omar Serrano described the remix as one that would fit into Luca Lush's "energetic sections of his live sets", noting the remix as proof that Luca Lush could "truly produce in any genre."

== Track listing ==
Digital download – Single
No.	Title	Length
1.	"Agen Wida"	3:19
Total length:		3:19

Digital download – Luca Lush Remix
No.	Title	Length
1.	"Agen Wida" (Luca Lush Remix)	2:54
Total length:		2:54

== Charts ==
Chart (2018)	Peak position
US Hot Dance/Electronic Songs (Billboard)	35

== Release history ==
Region	Date	Format	Version	Label	Ref.
Worldwide	19 October 2018	Digital download	Original release	Owsla	
Worldwide	19 December 2018	Digital download	Luca Lush Remix	Self-released	
