= Joyryde =

JOYRYDE
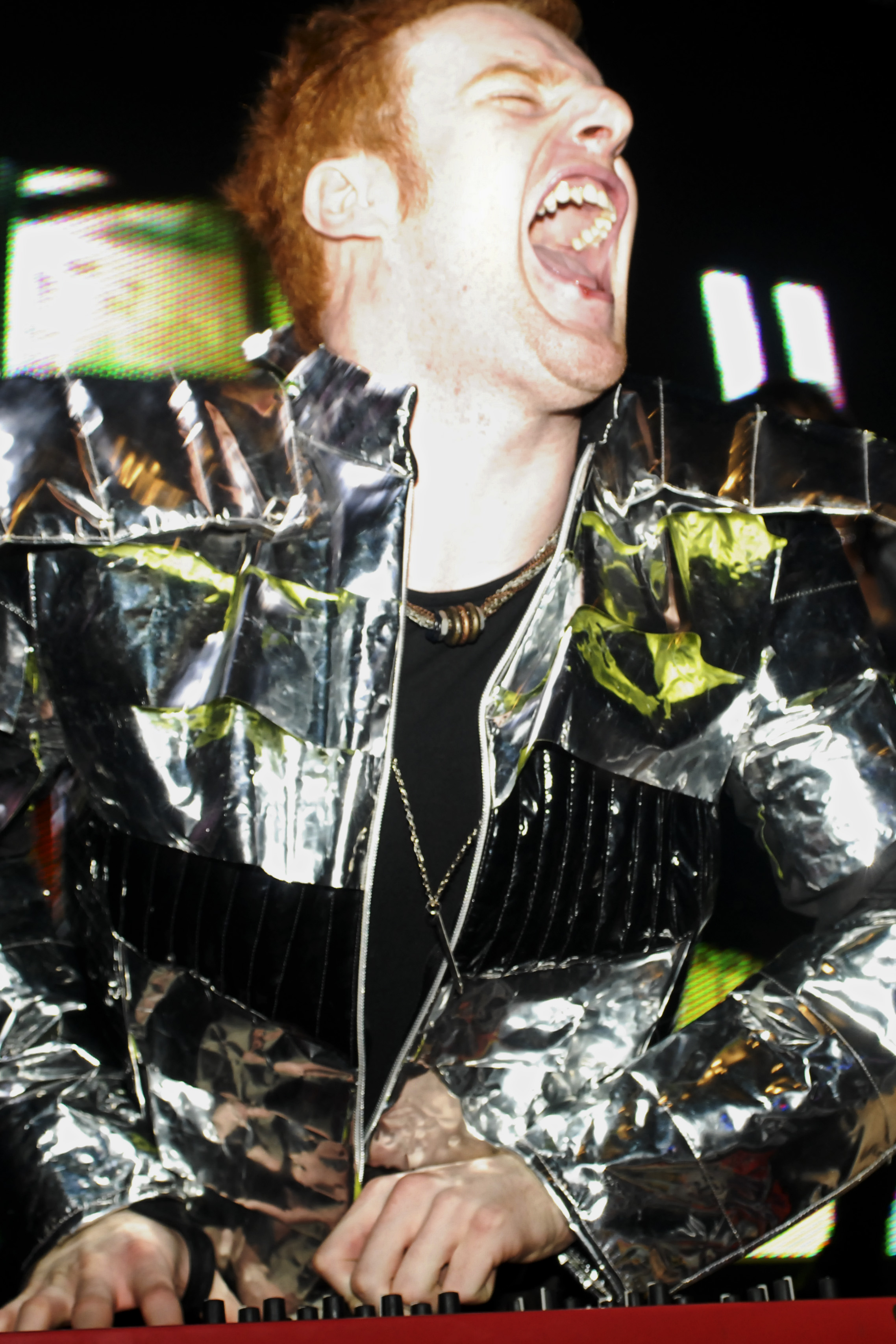

Background information
- Also known as: Eskimo, Lets Be Friends, Megaband
- Born: John Ford; 24 July 1985 (age 41)
- Origin: England, UK
- Genres: Bass house; hard house; dubstep; trap; future house
- Occupations: DJ; musician; producer
- Years active: 2003–present
- Labels: Owsla; Hard Recs

John Ford (born 24 July 1985), known professionally as JOYRYDE (stylized in all caps), is an English DJ and producer. He is the son of John Ford, the founder of the psytrance record label Phantasm Records.

== Career ==
=== 1998–2006: Early career ===
Inspired by his father, John Phantasm, and the music he was exposed to at home, Ford began producing music in a studio at the age of nine. However, he did not begin performing as a DJ internationally until he was 13. Immersed in the DJ lifestyle, Ford temporarily stepped away from studio production, returning at the age of 15 with a renewed interest in music creation, citing the increasing technicality of electronic music as a motivating factor. It was at this time that he began producing under the alias Eskimo, a name chosen because it bears no connection to the product. At the age of 17, he released his debut album, Can You Pick Me Up, in 2003.

Eskimo's music soon began appearing in the sets of psytrance DJs worldwide. By the time he performed his first live set, his catalogue of tracks had significantly expanded. During this period, he produced numerous remixes, some of which remain unreleased due to copyright issues. Among these, his unofficial remix of The Prodigy's "Voodoo People" gained particular popularity.

In the summer of 2004, Eskimo released his second studio album, Take A Look Out There, which featured the track "Party Pooper," well known for incorporating a sample of police shutting down a free party. The album was followed by the release of Balloonatic Part One in November 2005, with Balloonatic Part Two following suit in September 2006.

=== 2011–2015: Let's Be Friends ===
From 2011 to 2015, Ford was a member of the electronic music duo Lets Be Friends, known for releasing singles such as "Manslaughter" and "FTW". The duo has been inactive since Ford's transition to performing as Joyryde.

=== 2015–present: Joyryde ===
Since 2015, Ford has produced bass-heavy house music as a solo artist under the name Joyryde. His early releases, including tracks such as "Flo" and "Speed Trap," were distributed as free downloads.

In 2016, Joyryde signed with the record label Owsla, releasing the singles "Hot Drum" and "Damn" that year, followed by "I Ware House" and "New Breed" in 2017. In 2019, he signed with Hard Recs and released his debut studio album, Brave, in 2020.

== Discography ==
=== Studio albums as Eskimo ===
- 2003: Can you Pick Me Up? (Phantasm Records)
- 2004: Take a Look Out There (Phantasm Records, Arcadia Music)
- 2005: Balloonatic Part One (Phantasm Records)
- 2006: Balloonatic Part Two (Phantasm Records)
- 2010: Cheap Thrills (Phantasm Records)

=== Collaborations as Eskimo ===
- 2005: Dynamo - Acid Daze (Eskimo vs Dynamic, Phantasm Records)
- 2007: Void - Music With More Muscle (Chemical Crew)
- 2010: Balloonatic Part Three
- 2010: The Megaband - Propaganda (April 2010)

=== Extended plays with Lets Be Friends ===
- 2013: Lets Be Friends
- 2013: IOA

=== Singles with Lets Be Friends ===
- 2013: "Manslaughter" (VIP Mix)
- 2014: "FTW"

=== Studio albums as Joyryde ===
- 3 April 2020: Brave (HARD Records)

=== Charted singles ===
Title	Year	Peak chart positions	Album
Title	Year	US Hot Dance/Electronic Songs	Album
"Agen Wida" (with Skrillex)	2018	35	Non-album single

=== Singles as Joyryde ===
- 22 March 2015: "Kickin Off"
- 13 April 2015: "Hoodlum"
- 23 April 2015: "Mercy" (featuring Candi Staton)
- 11 May 2015: "Flo"
- 13 July 2015: "Speed Trap"
- 29 September 2015: "Give My Love"
- 20 October 2015: "Hari Kari"
- 8 December 2015: "Hoam"
- 12 January 2016: "Windows" (featuring Rick Ross)
- 15 February 2016: "Fuel Tank"
- 16 May 2016: "The Box"
- 20 July 2016: "Maximum King"
- 16 November 2016: "Hot Drum" (OWSLA)
- 5 December 2016: "Damn" (featuring Freddie Gibbs) (OWSLA)
- 21 February 2017: "I Ware House" (OWSLA)
- 5 May 2017: "New Breed" (featuring Darnell Williams) (OWSLA) []
- 22 February 2019: "I'm Gone" (Hard Records)
- 22 March 2019: "Yuck" (featuring Gold) (Hard Records)
- 23 August 2019: "Madden" (Hard Records)
- 4 October 2019: "Selecta 19" (Hard Records)

=== Remixes as Joyryde ===
- 15 September 2015: Jauz - "Feel The Volume" (Joyryde 'Stick It In Reverse' Mix)
- 25 March 2016: Destructo - "4 Real" (Joyryde 'Swurve' Mix)
