= Led Zeppelin North American Tour 1968–1969 =

1968–1969 concert tour by Led Zeppelin

North America 1968/1969
- Tour by Led Zeppelin
- Poster for Led Zeppelin's concerts at the Fillmore West, used to help promote its 1968/1969 tour of North America
- Location: United States; Canada
- Associated album: Led Zeppelin
- Start date: 26 December 1968
- End date: 16 February 1969
- No. of shows: 31 (39 scheduled)

Led Zeppelin concert chronology
- United Kingdom 1968; North America 1968/1969; United Kingdom & Scandinavia Spring 1969

Led Zeppelin's 1968/1969 tour of North America was the first concert tour of the United States and Canada by the English rock band. The tour commenced on 26 December 1968 and concluded on 16 February 1969. It was important for the band, as their popularity grew substantially because of the concerts and helped them reach significant commercial success in the US, which translated to sales elsewhere.

== Overview ==
The genesis of this tour was the cancellation of a concert tour by the Jeff Beck Group, which happened to be managed out of the same office occupied by Led Zeppelin's manager Peter Grant. Grant contacted the promoters and convinced them to take on Led Zeppelin instead.

To help publicise the band in America before the tour, Grant sent white label advance copies of the band's debut album to key FM radio stations. The album itself was issued on 13 January, almost mid-way through the tour. According to tour manager Richard Cole, the tour was underwritten by Grant, guitarist Jimmy Page, and bass player John Paul Jones, while singer Robert Plant and drummer John Bonham were paid a salary.

For this stint of concerts, Led Zeppelin initially played as the support act for bands such as Vanilla Fudge and Iron Butterfly (both of which were also contracted to Atlantic Records) and Country Joe & the Fish. However, as the tour progressed, it became apparent that Led Zeppelin was easily outshining the headline acts. Guitarist Jimmy Page noticed that by the time the group reached San Francisco, other groups were not turning up, and Led Zeppelin were then headliners.

Bassist John Paul Jones believed the reason their concerts were popular was because they played tightly and quickly without many delays, saying "we would just go on and go 'bang bang bang' with three driven songs with solos", which other groups did not do.

In one famous concert, Led Zeppelin's final of four nights performed at the Boston Tea Party, the band played for more than four hours with only one album worth of material. Grant was delighted with the group's performance, and the band then realised then that they would be a very successful rock band.

It was during this tour that Led Zeppelin's drummer, John Bonham, developed a close friendship with the drummer of Vanilla Fudge, Carmine Appice. The average fee charged by Led Zeppelin for a concert during this tour was around $1,500. It has been stated that for one show they performed for a mere $320. Figures like these would soon be dwarfed by the six-figure sums routinely demanded, and received, by Led Zeppelin on subsequent tours as their popularity skyrocketed. Peter Grant recalled that "The Yardbirds had been getting $2,500 a night but people like Bill Graham had faith in us and so did the kids who saw it." Grant, who was unable to attend the tour with the group, also stated:

I couldn't go with them, but it was a fantastic 12 date tour, and they said "Great, if that's what we've gotta do, we'll go and do it" ... Three of the group had never been to America before and didn't know what to expect. They did a week with the Vanilla Fudge. My instructions were for them to go over there and blast them out. Make each performance something everybody remembered. They really did that.

== Tour set list ==
Although there was some variation, a fairly typical set list for the tour was:

1. "Train Kept A-Rollin'" (Bradshaw, Kay, Mann)
2. "I Can't Quit You Baby" (Dixon)
3. "As Long As I Have You" (Mimms)
4. "Dazed and Confused" (Page)
5. "You Shook Me" (Dixon, Lenoir)
6. "White Summer"/"Black Mountain Side" (Page)
7. "Pat's Delight" (Bonham)
8. "Babe I'm Gonna Leave You" (Bredon, Page, Plant)
9. "How Many More Times" (Bonham, Jones, Page)
10. "Killing Floor" (Burnett)
11. "For Your Love" (Gouldman)
12. "Communication Breakdown" (Bonham, John Paul Jones, Page)

== Tour dates ==
List of North American Tour 1968–1969 concerts
Date	City	Country	Venue	Opening Act(s)	Attendance
26 December 1968	Denver	United States	Denver Auditorium Arena		N/A
27 December 1968	Seattle	United States	Seattle Center Arena		N/A
28 December 1968	Vancouver	Canada	Pacific Coliseum		3,708 / 15,038
29 December 1968	Portland	United States	Portland Civic Auditorium		N/A
30 December 1968	Spokane	United States	John F. Kennedy Memorial Pavilion		N/A
~~1 January 1969~~ (cancelled)	Salem	United States	Salem Armory Auditorium		N/A
2 January 1969	West Hollywood	United States	Whisky a Go Go		N/A
~~3 January 1969~~ (cancelled)	West Hollywood	United States	Whisky a Go Go		N/A
4 January 1969	West Hollywood	United States	Whisky a Go Go		N/A
5 January 1969	West Hollywood	United States	Whisky a Go Go		N/A
9 January 1969	San Francisco	United States	Fillmore West		N/A
10 January 1969	San Francisco	United States	Fillmore West		N/A
11 January 1969	San Francisco	United States	Fillmore West		N/A
12 January 1969	San Francisco	United States	Fillmore West		N/A
15 January 1969	Iowa City	United States	Iowa Memorial Union Main Lounge	Mother Blues	N/A
17 January 1969	Detroit	United States	Grande Ballroom	Linn County, Lawrence Blues Band	N/A
18 January 1969	Detroit	United States	Grande Ballroom	Target	N/A
19 January 1969	Detroit	United States	Grande Ballroom	Wind and/or Linn County	N/A
~~20 January 1969~~ (unconfirmed?)	Wheaton	United States	Wheaton Youth Center		N/A
23 January 1969	Boston	United States	Boston Tea Party	The Raven	N/A
24 January 1969	Boston	United States	Boston Tea Party	The Raven	N/A
25 January 1969	Boston	United States	Boston Tea Party	The Raven	N/A
26 January 1969	Boston	United States	Boston Tea Party	The Raven	N/A
~~29 January 1969~~ (cancelled)	Philadelphia	United States	Spectrum		N/A
31 January 1969	New York City	United States	Fillmore East		N/A
1 February 1969	New York City	United States	Fillmore East		N/A
2 February 1969	Toronto	Canada	The Rock Pile	Teegarden & Van Winkle, Mary Lou Horner	1,200 / 1,200
~~3 February 1969~~ (cancelled)	New York City	United States	Scene Club		N/A
~~4 February 1969~~ (cancelled)	New York City	United States	Scene Club		N/A
~~5 February 1969~~ (cancelled)	New York City	United States	Scene Club		N/A
~~6 February 1969~~ (cancelled)	New York City	United States	Scene Club		N/A
7 February 1969	Chicago	United States	Kinetic Playground		N/A
8 February 1969	Chicago	United States	Kinetic Playground		N/A
~~10 February 1969~~ (unconfirmed; likely cancelled)	Memphis	United States	Elma Roane Fieldhouse		N/A
14 February 1969	Miami Beach	United States	Thee Image Club		N/A
15 February 1969	Miami Beach	United States	Thee Image Club		N/A
16 February 1969	Baltimore	United States	Baltimore Civic Center		N/A

== See also ==
- Led Zeppelin Played Here
