= Yuck (song) =

Single by Joyryde featuring Gold

from the album Brave
- Released: 22 March 2019
- Recorded: 2018–2019
- Genre: Trap; hip-hop
- Length: 3:00
- Label: Hard Recs
- Songwriter(s): Kawaun Saunders
- Producer(s): John Ford

Joyryde singles chronology
| "I'm Gone" (2019) | "Yuck" (2019) | "Madden" (2019) |

Music video
- "Yuck" on YouTube

"Yuck" (stylised as "YUCK") is a song by English DJ and producer Joyryde, featuring vocals by Chicago-based rapper Gold. It was released on 22 March 2019 by American record label Hard Recs. The song was featured as part of Joyryde's debut album, Brave.

== Background and release ==
Two days prior to release, Joyryde uploaded a preview for his next single to various social media platforms, including Instagram and Twitter. The preview announced that the song was titled "Yuck" and was to feature Chicago-based rapper Gold as vocals and including a quote from the song, saying "Not a world of words, but of things that you cannot express."

On 22 March 2019, the song was released as a digital download on international digital stores, as well as being released through various music streaming services. The song was released as the second single for Joyryde's debut album Brave, following the release of the first single "I'm Gone" in February. The song was marked as Joyryde's second release of Hard Recs, a subsidiary of the North American-based music festival and concert brand Hard.

== Critical reception ==
"Yuck" was well received by most critics. Writing for Billboard, Koury Angelo wrote that the song took Joyryde's signature "dark house and runs it through mechanical whirs and tinny 808s." Dancing Astronaut's Bella Bagshaw called the song one of Joyryde's "most lurid releases to date", writing that the song artists "use the track to rendezvous within the notion of keeping one’s head down while remaining devoted to an artistic endeavour in order to foster and maintain a sense of individualism in the process." Peach Gallagher of Run the Trap praised the song's quality, writing that Joyryde "turns the party into a riot with god-like production skills that command listeners to kick it up a notch." Writing for Your EDM, Karlie Powell praised the song, noting its mix of hip hop, bass, and trap music and writing that Joyryde "proves yet again that he’s the master of bass-driven, genre-bending certified slappers."

== Track listing ==
Digital download – Single
| No. | Title | Length |
|---|---|---|
| 1. | "Yuck" | 3:00 |
| Total length: | | 3:00 |

== Release history ==
| Region | Date | Format | Label | Ref. |
|---|---|---|---|---|
| Worldwide | 22 March 2019 | Digital download | Hard Recs | |
