= Madden (song) =

2019 song by Joyryde

Single by Joyryde

from the album Brave
- Released: 23 August 2019
- Genre: Bass house
- Length: 3:46
- Label: Hard Recs
- Songwriter: Joyryde
- Producer: John Ford

Joyryde singles chronology
| "Yuck" (2019) | "Madden" (2019) | "Selecta 19" (2019) |

Music video
- "Madden" on YouTube

"Madden" (stylised as "MADDEN") is a song by English DJ and producer Joyryde. It was released on 23 August 2019 by American record label Hard Recs. The song is to be featured as part of Joyryde's debut album, Brave.

== Background and release ==
In a press release to promote the song, Joyryde stated that he was inspired to create something that features a Lamborghini Countach after watching the film The Wolf of Wall Street. On 26 July, he organised two of the cars to be featured at his show in the Hollywood Palladium in Los Angeles.

On 15 August 2019, Joyryde announced the release date of his third album single, "Madden" via social media. Prior to release, the song was featured prominently in Joyryde's live-sets.

On 23 August 2019, the song was released as a digital download on international digital stores, as well as being released through various music streaming services. The song was released as the third single for Joyryde's debut album Brave, following the release of the second single "Yuck" in March.

== Critical reception ==
"Madden" was well received by most critics. Noting the song's use of "Release Yo' Delf" by Method Man, Rachel Woods of EDM.com described the dialogue from the sample as "bold" and that the song built itself into "another classic dancefloor anthem." Dancing Astronaut's Jessica Mao also commented on the sample, calling it "soulful" before it catapults "into a futuristic high-octane breakdown." Writing for Your EDM, Matthew Meadow noted the song as having a "significant UK flair to his bass house with a bit of hip hop thrown into the mix that only he has been seemingly able to master", later praising the song's "complementary vocals and a powerful bassline that persistently drives everything forward." Max Chung of Run the Trap described the song as having Joyryde's signature "mayhem", with the track featuring "classic house plucks and unique vocals." EDMTunes' Dominique Canez noted the song as having a blend of trap music, bass music and UK hard house and called it an "uncontested banger."

== Track listing ==
Digital download – Single
| No. | Title | Length |
|---|---|---|
| 1. | "Madden" | 3:46 |
| Total length: | | 3:46 |

== Release history ==
| Region | Date | Format | Label | Ref. |
|---|---|---|---|---|
| Worldwide | 23 August 2019 | Digital download | Hard Recs | |
