= New Breed =

New Breed or The New Breed may refer to:

== Film and television ==
- The New Breed (TV series), a 1960s American crime drama
- "The New Breed" (The Outer Limits), an episode
- The New Breed, a 2020 documentary feature film about social entrepreneurs by Pete Williams

== Music ==
- New Breed (music duo), an American Christian Latin hip hop duo
- New Breed (Jay Park album), 2011/2012
- New Breed (Dawn Richard album), 2019
- The New Breed (MC Breed album), 1993
- The New Breed (Jeff Parker album), 2016
- 50 Cent: The New Breed, a 2003 documentary and video album by rapper 50 Cent
- "New Breed" (song), by Joyryde, 2017
- New Breed, backing band of Israel Houghton
- The New Breed, a 1960s band featuring Timothy B. Schmit

== Professional wrestling ==
- New Breed (1980s tag team), a team consisting of Chris Champion and Sean Royal
- The New Breed (ECW), a professional wrestling stable

== See also ==
- Dig the New Breed, a 1982 album by The Jam
