= Selecta 19 =

Single by Joyryde

from the album Brave
- Released: 4 October 2019
- Genre: Bass house
- Length: 4:10
- Label: Hard Recs
- Producer(s): John Ford

Joyryde singles chronology
"Madden" (2019)	"Selecta 19" (2019)

"Selecta 19" (stylised as "SELECTA 19") is a song by English DJ and producer Joyryde. It was released on 4 October 2019 by American record label Hard Recs. The song was featured as part of Joyryde's debut album, Brave. The song samples "Selecta" (2010) by Cleo.

== Background and release ==
On 4 October 2019, the song was released as a digital download on international digital stores, as well as being released through various music streaming services. The song was released as the fourth single for Joyryde's debut album Brave, following the release of the third single "Madden" in August.

== Critical reception ==
"Selecta 19" was well received by most critics. Writing for Dancing Astronaut, David Klemow heavily praised the song, noting Joyryde's signature style of "high-octane, bass-riddled house" and stating that no less should be expected from the bass house producer. Your EDM's Karlie Powell called the song full of "unrelenting, powerhouse bass", noting it as a showcase of the producers more "bouncy" style. EDM.com's Sarah Kocur described the song as capturing the essence of Joyryde's style, particularly noting the "infectious topline and high-impact, moving, four-on-the-floor beat." Joyryde commented on what he wanted to make with the song, calling it a "no ego, fun, jump up good vibe". Josue Paredes of EDMTunes affirmed that Joyryde "absolutely delivered that fun track he wanted to give to the fans." Run the Trap's Omar Serrano gave the song warm reception for its mix of "obnoxious" vocals alongside the "harsh" bassline, with the combination of two creating an "absolute nasty cut."

== Track listing ==
Digital download – Single
No.	Title	Length
1.	"Selecta 19"	4:10
Total length:		4:10

== Release history ==
Region	Date	Format	Label	Ref.
Worldwide	4 October 2019	Digital download	Hard Recs	
