= Manslaughter (disambiguation) =

Manslaughter is a legal term in various jurisdictions for the killing of a human being not deemed to be murder.

Manslaughter may also refer to:

== Law ==
- Manslaughter in English law
- Culpable homicide, variously defined in several, mostly Commonwealth of Nations, jurisdictions
- Manslaughter (United States law)
- Voluntary manslaughter, a form of intentional homicide in American law

== Entertainment ==
- Manslaughter (comics), a character in the Marvel Universe
- Manslaughter (1922 film), US, directed by Cecil B. DeMille
- Manslaughter (1930 film), US, directed by George Abbott
- Manslaughter (1957 film), Australian documentary about the Warburton Ranges Controversy
- Manslaughter (2005 film), Danish film
- Manslaughter (2012 film), Dutch film
- Manslaughter (album), 2014, metal band Body Count
- "Manslaughter" (song), 2013, by Lets Be Friends
- "Manslaughter", 2021 song by Pop Smoke from the album Faith
- "Manslaughter" (Between the Lines), a 1993 TV episode
