= Hot Drum =

Single by Joyryde
- Released: 7 September 2016 (Original release); 16 November 2016 (Re-release)
- Recorded: 2016
- Genre: Bass house
- Length: 4:26
- Label: Owsla
- Songwriter(s): John Ford
- Producer(s): John Ford

Joyryde singles chronology
"Maximum King" (2016)	"Hot Drum" (2016)	"Damn" (2016)

Music video
- "Hot Drum" on YouTube

"Hot Drum" (stylized as "HOT DRUM") is a song by English DJ and producer John Ford. It was originally released on 7 September 2016, but was re-released by American record label Owsla on 16 November 2016.

== Background and release ==
The song originated from a reggae drum loop, which gave the song its title. The song was originally self-released for free as a digital download via SoundCloud on 7 September 2016, with the American record label and creative collective Owsla re-releasing the song two months later on 16 November 2016. The song was released alongside an announcement of a three-track extended play by Ford to be released on the record label in mid-2017. The song piqued the interest of American electronic dance music producer Skrillex, who debuted his Boiler Room DJ set with the song, leading to the re-release of the song on Skrillex's own record label.

The music video was released by Ford via his YouTube channel on 6 September 2016. It was later re-uploaded by OWSLA via their own YouTube Channel on 16 November 2016.

== Critical reception ==
"Hot Drum" was well received by most critics. Austin Evenson of Dancing Astronaut noted Ford's style as "yielding energetic, bass-heavy outputs", describing the song as built upon a "bustling, house foundation, which Joyryde layers with a clamouring steel drum for a refreshing, groove-ridden lead." Writing for Your EDM, Greg Sills wrote that the song took to Fords roots of his sound, noting the song's utilisation of a reggae drum loop and his "signature bass and percussive style" and calling the song "yet another epic Joyryde tune." Max Chung of Run the Trap described the song as yet another showcase of Ford's unique talent for bass house-influenced sound, calling the song a "funky house banger boasting some crazy call and response." Wendel Genosa of Earmilk called the song "solid proof of the producer's creative tactics and ear for unique compositions." Noiseporn's Reid Golden praised the song, describing it as the "cream of the crop" of bass house, noting its structure as featuring Ford's "signature high-energy, four-on-the-floor beats, paired with some funky, reggae-infused drums, and topped off with a filthy bassline." Writing for EDMTunes, Joey Rubio noted its perfected "Crazy samples and unique sounds", stating that the song threw "so much diversity of sound into his bass house music."

== Track listing ==
Digital download – Single
No.	Title	Length
1.	"Hot Drum"	4:26
Total length:		4:26

== Release history ==
Region	Date	Format	Version	Label	Ref.
Worldwide	7 September 2016	Digital download	Original release	Self-released	
Worldwide	16 November 2016	Digital download	Re-release	Owsla	
