= Ernest Borgnine on the Bus =

- Directed by: Jeff Krulik
- Written by: Brendan Conway; Jeff Krulik
- Produced by: Joyce McConnell
- Starring: Ernest Borgnine
- Edited by: Michael Krulik; Erica Parker
- Release date: April 1, 1997
- Running time: 45 minutes
- Country: United States
- Language: English

Ernest Borgnine on the Bus is a 1997 video documentary short featuring Ernest Borgnine. It chronicles Borgnine on his 1996 road trip in his bus across the United States to greet his fans. The documentary was directed by Jeff Krulik.

== Reception ==
Erin Richter of Entertainment Weekly graded the film a B.
