= FTW (song) =

Single by Lets Be Friends

from the album Monstercat 016 – Expedition
- Released: 3 February 2014
- Genre: Electro house
- Length: 4:17
- Label: Monstercat
- Songwriter: John Ford * Oren Emanuel.
- Producers: John Ford; Oren Emanuel

Lets Be Friends singles chronology
"Manslaughter (VIP Mix)" (2013)	"FTW" (2014)	"Only Time" (2014)

Alternative cover

"FTW" (an abbreviation of "For the win") is a song by electronic music duo Lets Be Friends, consisting of English DJ and producer John Ford and Israeli electronic music producer Oren Emanuel. Canadian record label Monstercat released it on 3 February 2014. The song was originally released as part of the compilation album Monstercat 016 – Expedition, released 26 February 2014. It was later featured as part of Monstercat's Best of 2014 compilation album, released on 26 January 2015.

== Background and release ==
On 3 February 2014, the song was released as a digital download on international digital stores through record label Monstercat, as well as being released through various music streaming services. "FTW" was featured on the compilation album titled Monstercat 016 – Expedition released on 26 February 2014. The song was later featured on the yearly best-of compilation album titled Monstercat – Best of 2014 released on 26 January 2015. As of 13 June 2019, the song has gained around 1,200,000 plays on SoundCloud and over 3,060,000 views on Monstercat's Uncaged YouTube channel.

== Critical reception ==
"FTW" was well received by most critics. A writer for Complex noted the song's sampled use of American professional wrestler Triple H of D-Generation X, during a WWE promo, writing that the screams of the wrestler "have a place in gigantic rings around the country and of course in the big rooms of dance floors in clubs worldwide." Writing for Vibe, Jessica Wunsch described the song as a "delightful composition of various musical genres and elements seamlessly mutated into one hype-building score." Writing for Your EDM, Brett Edgerly described the song as having the "full spectrum of flavour" expected from the duo, praising the song's sound design as "on point with signature and new patches making a full-bodied appearance." Steven Jacobs of EDM Sauce wrote the track as "unreal", describing its production as one that brings "all kinds of sounds together that will have your blood racing and your heart pumping out of your chest." A Dance Music NW writer compared the song to the duo's previous song "Manslaughter", writing that "FTW" is packed with "glitchy, chaotic elements that stands up to the best in electro, along with yet another badass voice sampling that Lets Be Friends is best known for."

== Track listing ==
Digital download – Single
No.	Title	Length
1.	"FTW"	4:17
Total length:		4:17

== Release history ==
Region	Date	Format	Version	Label	Ref.
Worldwide	3 February 2014	Digital download	"FTW"	Monstercat	
Worldwide	26 February 2014	Digital download	Monstercat 016 – Expedition	Monstercat	
Worldwide	26 January 2015	Digital download	Monstercat – Best of 2014	Monstercat	
