= Heavy Metal Parking Lot =

1986 documentary short produced by Jeff Krulik and John Heyn

- Directed by: John Heyn and Jeff Krulik
- Release date: 1986
- Running time: 17 minutes
- Country: United States
- Language: English

Heavy Metal Parking Lot is a 1986 shot-on-video documentary short produced by Jeff Krulik and John Heyn. The film features interviews with several small groups of young heavy metal fans gathered for a tailgate party in the parking lot outside the Capital Centre in Landover, Maryland on May 31, 1986, as they prepare for a Judas Priest/Dokken concert being held there later that evening.

== Reputation and legacy ==
By the early 1990s, Heavy Metal Parking Lot had become an underground cult-classic, usually traded on bootleg VHS videotapes. It was reportedly a favorite on the Nirvana tour bus, among many other bands. Due to growing popularity of the film, music copyright issues arose between the producers and Judas Priest, though they were eventually resolved. The film has been referred to as the "Citizen Kane of Wasted Teenage Metal."

Heavy Metal Parking Lot was positioned at #67 by Rolling Stone on their list of 70 greatest music documentaries.

== Sequels ==
Krulik and Heyn attempted to follow up Heavy Metal Parking Lot with Monster Truck Parking Lot in 1988, which showed fans of a monster truck rally, but the film was unfinished and unreleased. They then created Neil Diamond Parking Lot (1996) which showed fans before a Neil Diamond concert at the same Capital Centre parking lot, ten years after the original. In 1999, they created Harry Potter Parking Lot.

Krulik and Heyn created and co-produced the 2004 TV series Parking Lot in association with Radical Media, which was broadcast on Trio. The series showed enthusiasts of various bands (like Phish) and activities (like surfing). Eight episodes were produced.

In 2006, a sequel of sorts was released by SnagFilms, entitled Heavy Metal Parking Lot Alumni: Where Are They Now. The 19-minute film looks at the adult lives of several of the young people featured in the original 1986 film.

== Home media ==
In May 2006, the documentary was released on DVD, to coincide with the 20th anniversary of its filming. The DVD version contains the original 17-minute film, as well as over 2 hours of exclusive content, including an interview with the infamous "Zebra-man" (a 22-year-old at the time), whom Krulik and Heyn tracked down and interviewed in the summer of 1999, 13 years after the original filming.

== Cultural references ==
- The music video for the 2000 song "Flavor of the Weak" by American Hi-Fi is an homage to Heavy Metal Parking Lot, featuring the band members and others dressed as specific people from the documentary, and spouting variations on some of the same dialogue.
- The music video for the 2005 song "Just Want You to Know" by the Backstreet Boys also references Heavy Metal Parking Lot.
- The Ska Punk band Less Than Jake included scenes from the movie in the music video for their song "All My Best Friends Are Metalheads".
- The season two episode of the television show Friday Night Lights titled "Humble Pie", Jean gives a mixtape to Landry that she labeled Heavy Metal Parking Lot; Jean is previously described as a fan of cult movies and music.
- The 2019 Steel Panther album Heavy Metal Rules is named after the "philosophy" of the "Zebra-man"
- Dialogue from the film is sampled several times on The Avalanches’ 2016 album Wildflower.
- Clips from the film were shown during the 2022 induction of Judas Priest into the Rock and Roll Hall of Fame.

== See also ==
- The Decline of Western Civilization Part II: The Metal Years
