= Barry "The Reazar" Richards =

American musical artist (1946–2026)

- Barry "Reazar" Richards and Debra "Reazett" Richards

Background information
- Born: Barry Richards; November 23, 1946; Washington, D.C., U.S.
- Died: August 15, 2026 (aged 83)
- Occupation: Music consultant
- Years active: 1965–2026

Barry "The Reazar" Richards (November 23, 1942 – August 15, 2026) was an American radio and television personality, concert promoter and music producer from Washington, D.C. He made an impact during the late 1960s to early 1970s by introducing progressive rock to radio on the East coast.

== Background ==
Richards was born in Washington, D.C. on November 23, 1942. He lived in Beverly Hills with his wife, Debra, and had three sons: Stevie "Rocker" Richards (deceased), Gary Richards (music executive) and Paul Richards.

Richards died on August 15, 2026, at the age of 83.

== Career ==
=== On air ===
Richards first made it on the radio thanks to Don Dillard by reading on-air dedications on WDON Washington, D.C. He carried records to Don's record-hops where he played the records while Don MC'd. He also danced on The Milt Grant Show and convinced the artists who appeared on the TV show to do Don's record hops. He stayed at WDON while he was at school, until the station went Country/Western.

By 1965 he found opportunities in radio stations such as:

- WDON(AM) Washington, D.C.
- WMID(AM) station in Atlantic City
- WYRE(AM) in Annapolis
- WITH/Tiger radio(AM) in Baltimore
- WUST(AM) in Washington, D.C.
- WINX(AM) in Washington, D.C.
- WHMC(AM) Washington, D.C. – Program director and afternoon drive making WHMC the first progressive Rock station on the east coast. It wasn't until radio station owner Nick Chaconas gave Barry the creative freedom to program album cuts and become the first underground radio station, which later morphed into free-form radio. He became known as your heavy Head Leader. He would play Led Zeppelin, Janis Joplin, Jimi Hendrix, Jefferson Airplane.
- WKTK(FM) in Baltimore – Program director and afternoon drive
- WEEL(AM) Washington, D.C. – Nighttime air personality
- WKYS(FM) in Washington, D.C. – Station known as Disco 92, making it the first all disco station in the country
- WMOD(FM) in Washington, D.C. – Known now as WMZQ he was again nighttime air personality
- WEAM(AM) in Washington, D.C. – Program director and afternoon drive – In 1976–1978, a time where African-American and white music didn't mix, radio stations such as WEAM broke the mold by playing songs with no ethnic political or stylistic boundaries. Known as Urban Contemporary.
- WAIL 105.3 FM located in New Orleans, it's a "Cinderella story" according to owner Ed Muniz, The station faced stylistic changes and needed to be successful in 1980 when he teamed up with experienced Barry Richards the station jumped to number one.
- KGFJ(AM)/KUTE(FM) in Los Angeles – Program director and afternoon drive
- KBOS-FM/B95 in Fresno – Program director and afternoon drive
- National program director for Bresson-Hafler Media Group with stations in Philadelphia, Youngstown, Ohio, Columbia and Myrtle Beach, South Carolina.
- WJLQ(FM)/WCOA(AM) Pensacola, Florida – Co-owner, program director and afternoon drive
- KQQB/KAZZ Spokane, Washington – Co-owner
- KVPW(FM) Fresno with Jerry Clifton
- On air Sirius XM Radio Strobe Channel Last on-air job

=== Promoting ===
Richards became a music consultant to many record labels and was part of a team to help Black Sabbath, Alice Cooper, Led Zeppelin, Emerson Lake & Palmer, J Geils, Jethro Tull, Edgar Winter and Johnny Winter.

He later started HARD Events with son Gary Richards, now known as Destructo.

== Free-form television ==
Richards promoted many artists through several popular television shows including Turn-On, Barry Richards Rock and Soul at WDCA-TV 20 Washington, D.C., Video Disco, Studio 78, WJLA/Ch.7/Washington, D.C., WMAR/Ch2/Baltimore, Video Trax on WWL/ch.4 and WDSU/Ch.6 New Orleans", Video Zoo on KDOC TV Los Angeles, BTV(Fresno Ch. 57) and Fox Breakfast Club Movie WPMI-TV 15 mobile Alabama Fox New Network. Some times local comedians as Uncle Dirty a/k/a Robert Altman, Robert Klein, Richard Pryor, Cheech and Chong will be on his shows. Richards also ran the Rhythm section of HitMakers magazine called Reazar's Records.

=== Turn On ===
On UHF Channel 20 he broadcast a blend of rock and camp mixing live acid-rock acts such as Steppenwolf, Zephyr and Dr. John with Flash Gordon serials, movies from the forties and fifties, Allan Freed rock musicals, interviews with Playboy bunnies, Buster Crabbe (The original Flash) and movie stars such as Charlton Heston, Robert Mitchum and Cornel Wilde. In one set from 1973, Fats Domino was accompanied by Roger McGuinn and The Byrds and taught them how to perform his songs.

Richards called the format 'free-form television', emphasizing progressive rock acts playing live on TV for the first time. The show started at 11 o'clock on Saturday night and continued until the material was done, ending with the national anthem.

=== Rock'n Soul ===
Recording at WDCA-TV, 5202 River Road, Bethesda took place Friday nights at 1:00 am and Saturday mornings at 10:00 am; later the show moved to 8:00 pm Saturday night. This live show included young people dancing to the hits of the day and in-person performances by such artists as The Commodores, Eddie Kendricks, Kool & the Gang, The O'Jays, War, Billy Preston, Earth, Wind & Fire, Joe Simon, B. T. Express and James Brown.

=== Video disco ===
This 1970s TV show, featured disco music, disco fashion and disco dancing. The show had a budget of $150,000, backed by Indian-born entrepreneur Surinder Dhillon.

=== Studio 78 ===
On July 27, 1978, WJLA began airing "Studio 78" featuring disco dancing and celebrity interviews. Sponsors were HECHT Co./ May Company, Channel 2 and Channel 7. Acts included Gloria Gaynor, Village People, Donna Summer, Andy Gibb, Evelyn King and BT Express.

=== Video Trax ===
In the 1980s Richards became known as Reazar. He joined efforts with Rod Carter a program director at channel 6 to create Video Trax, a dance show. It ran from September 1982 to May 1983, before gaining the financial and promotional support of Pepsi Cola and moving the show to WWL channel 4 in New Orleans.

== Concert promoter ==
As a concert promoter Richards brought such progressive rock acts as Black Sabbath, Alice Cooper, Led Zeppelin, Emerson Lake & Palmer, J Geils, Jethro Tull, Edgar Winter, Johnny Winter, Joe Cocker and Steppenwolf to a roller rink in Alexandria, Virginia.

Other concerts included most of the 1970s rock and R&B shows in Washington, D.C., and Baltimore. He did several discos with superstar DJ Wolfman Jack from the Midnight Special NBC TV Show. He promoted the 1977 Brute Music Festival, a three-day weekend that headlined Earth, Wind & Fire, The Commodores, Kool & the Gang, The Emotions, The Sylvers, Bohannon, Tyrone Davis, Michael Henderson, Johnnie Taylor, Gil Scott-Heron, Jimmy Castor, Shotgun, Walter Jackson, Les McCann, Juju, Brute, The Brothers Johnson and Slave. Almost every R&B Soul artist performed, it was live acts from 12 noon to 3 am, after that was continuous disco.

=== Carefree Sugarfree Gum ===
In 1980 Richards hosted a yearlong tour as promotion director for Carefree Sugarfree Gum owned by the Squib Company in New York, they were tied in with a radio station in every city with the local big DJ. Part of the promotion was to increase awareness of Carefree Sugarless gum, which had just come out, through a series of shows taking place in preselected high schools visiting 30 cities. One school in each city that collected the most gum wrappers won a free concert with Hall & Oates, a visit from the local DJ, prizes and $1000 cash.

In the 1990s, he became editor of the Rhythm section in Hitmaker's Magazine from January 1995 to January 2004. In 2000 he started his own promotion company, Reazar Record Promotions.

=== Shows ===
Richards hosted California Championship Wrestling Live at the Olympic in Los Angeles as well as the San Bernardino Arena in San Bernardino. He also hosted a Latin Top 40 show, produced and hosted live music videos shows such as: a dance show called Wing Ding WDCA Washington, D.C. 1967, Grove In WTTG Washington, D.C. 1969 Barry Richards Turn On (1970–1972) WDCA TV Washington, D.C., Barry Richards Rock Show WMAR TV Baltimore, Maryland (1972–1973), Barry Richards presents Rock Movies WTOP in Washington, D.C. (1973–1974), Barry Richards Rock and Soul WDCA Washington, D.C. (1975–1977), Video Disc WDCA Washington, D.C. TV 1977, Studio 78 WJLA TV Washington, D.C. and WMAR TV Baltimore, Maryland 1978, Live at the Famous with Barry Richards WDSU New Orleans 1980, Video Tracks WDSU New Orleans (1981–1983), Video Tracks WWL TV New Orleans, Louisiana (1983–1985), Video ZOO KDOC Los Angeles, CATV there is a clip Los Angeles times magazine (1986–1988).

== Press ==
Richards was featured in magazines as the Rolling Stone, Billboard, Radio & Records, and newspapers such as The Washington Post, The Merriweather Post Magazine, The Washington Star, The Arlington News and Time Herald.

== See also ==
- Led Zeppelin Played Here
