= Tennyson (band) =

Canadian electronic music duo

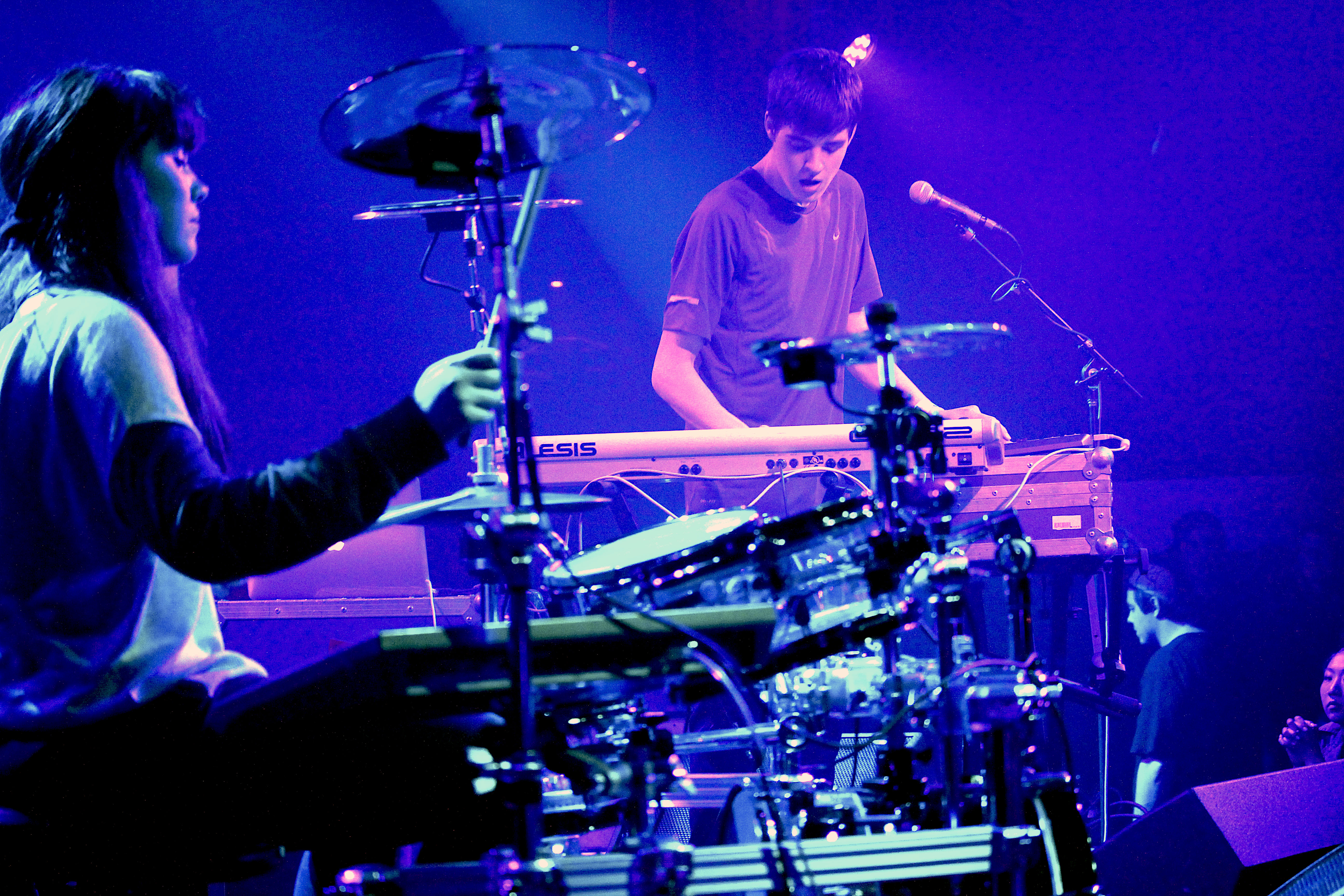
- Tennyson performing at The Fonda Theatre, Hollywood, 2014

Background information
- Origin: Edmonton, Alberta, Canada
- Genres: Electronica, Nu-jazz, pop
- Years active: 2012–present
- Labels: Counter Records, Owsla, Secret Songs
- Members: Luke Pretty; Tess Pretty
- Website: https://tennyson.rocks

Tennyson are a Canadian musical duo consisting of siblings Luke and Tess Pretty formed in 2012.

== Origins ==
Tennyson was formed by Luke and Tess Pretty in 2012. The pair began busking in Edmonton between ages 7 and 9, covering songs by bands such as The Beatles, Coldplay, and Weezer.

Both Tess and Luke were encouraged to be creative from a very young age by their father, Greg Pretty. Luke and Tess shared how their father did this by painting shapes and images on their tables and chairs at home, as well as helping them make intricate homemade Halloween costumes throughout their childhood.

Once Luke started gaining a following for his electronic style music, the duo decided to fuse their Jazz and Blues background with Luke's electronic and sound sample styled music.

== Musical career ==
=== 2012–2016 ===
In 2014, Luke decided to incorporate electronica into his music, enlisting his sister on drums, and posting the resulting music to SoundCloud. This gained the attention of Canadian producer Ryan Hemsworth, who chose the track "You're Cute" to launch his online imprint "Secret Songs".

Later that year, Tennyson released two tracks: “With You” and “Lay-by.”

In 2015, Tennyson released the Like What? EP with six tracks. The music video for the title track was directed by Fantavious Fritz.

Tennyson performed an opening act for M83's Junk tour in 2016, they were also featured in the Lollapalooza lineup in 2016.

=== 2017–2021 ===
Tennyson performed at numerous music festivals in 2017. They performed alongside artists such as Vince Staples, BADBADNOTGOOD, Dawes, Post Malone, Moby, Wiz Khalifa, Flying Lotus, The Knocks, Chris Lake, Gorillaz, Lorde, blink-182 and Chance the Rapper.

In 2017, Tennyson collaborated with BJ the Chicago Kid and Mr. Carmack to create the EP entitled Tuesday, Wednesday, Thursday. The collaborators partnered with Red Bull to release the EP for the Red Bull Sound Select event. Tennyson was also featured on Red Bull’s website.

Later that year, the duo had toured in Europe, Asia and Australia.

On March 1, 2019, Tennyson released Different Water quickly followed by the release of the EP entitled Telescope on November 22, 2019. Different Water has been described as "memorable melodies and busy, layered beats with touches of their jazz background sliding in and out of their compositions".

Different Water and Telescope included more vocal tracks than usual for the duo. Telescope was inspired by Luke's time in Japan and Waneella's viral image. Luke wanted to capture the image's feelings of clarity and stillness through sound in his album.

=== 2022–present ===
Luke Pretty released his second album entitled Rot on February 18, 2022. The music of Rot was inspired by the musician's struggle with a hearing condition he developed due to mold exposure. Tennyson were listed on Billboard's 10 Dance Artists To Watch in 2022.

In the same year, Tennyson went on various show tours across the North America and Europe. The duo was joined by the guitarist Beau Diako and bassist Akos Forgacs.

In 2024, Luke collaborated with Seattle artist Leslie for a seven track album entitled "Dolphin".

== Musical style ==
The pair's "indietronic pop" style of music has been described as "a little R&B, a little jazz, a little classical, divinely characterised through the diverse array of instruments present". Many of their tracks contain organic sounds such as water, fire, and percussive sounds from bongo drums, glass and jungle-inspired beats. They have also been known to sample a wide range of sounds, such as purring cats, ring tones, texting noises, Mac OS sound effects and notably the "door left ajar" car sound in their track "Lay-by".

Following the release of Different Water EP, Luke released a sample pack bearing the same name on Splice.

== Discography ==
=== Studio albums ===
Title	Details
Tennyson	Released: 4 April 2012; Label: Luke Tennyson Pretty; Format: Digital download
Rot	Released: 18 February 2022; Label: Counter Records; Format: Digital download, Vinyl
Dolphin (with Leslie)	Released: 20 September 2024; Label: Tennyson + Leslie; Format: Digital download
aka	Released: 7 November 2025; Label: Tennyson; Format: Digital download, Vinyl, CD

=== Extended plays ===
Title	Details
Blamer	Released: 3 December 2012; Label: Tennyson; Format: Digital download
Like What	Released: 23 November 2015; Label: Tennyson; Format: Digital download
Tuesday Wednesday Thursday	Released: 14 February 2017; Label: Tennyson & Mr. Carmack; Format: Digital download
Uh Oh!	Released: 29 September 2017; Label: OWSLA; Format: Digital download
Different Water	Released: 1 March 2019; Label: Tennyson; Format: Digital download
Telescope	Released: 22 November 2019; Label: Counter Records; Format: Digital download
plx	Released: 3 July 2026; Label: Tennyson; Format: Digital download

=== Singles ===
Title	Details
Violet Alturas	Released: 11 June 2013; Label: Tennyson; Format: Digital download
Aphasia Rewinding	Released: 3 November 2013; Label: Tennyson; Format: Digital download
No Answer	Released: 15 December 2013; Label: Tennyson; Format: Digital download
For You	Released: 27 January 2014; Label: Tennyson; Format: Digital download
You're Cute	Released: 16 May 2014; Label: Secret Songs; Format: Digital download
Lay-by	Released: 1 July 2014; Label: Tennyson; Format: Digital download
With You	Released: 8 October 2014; Label: Tennyson; Format: Digital download
In One Piece	Released: 19 November 2014; Label: Tennyson; Format: Digital download
Smother (feat. Mothica)	Released: 8 March 2015; Label: Tennyson; Format: Digital download
Slipperz	Released: 18 November 2015; Label: Tennyson; Format: Digital download
XYZ	Released: 10 June 2016; Label: Last Gang; Format: Digital download
All Yours	Released: 6 October 2017; Label: Tennyson; Format: Digital download
Your Eyes (feat. Njomza)	Released: 31 July 2018; Label: Foreign Family Collective / Counter Records; Format: Digital download
Tuesday	Released: 4 April 2019; Label: PLS&TY; Format: Digital download
Wednesday	Released: 4 April 2019; Label: PLS&TY; Format: Digital download
Thursday (feat. BJ the Chicago Kid)	Released: 4 April 2019; Label: PLS&TY; Format: Digital download
Cry Bird	Released: 6 October 2017; Label: Tennyson; Format: Digital download
Face the Night	Released: 31 July 2018; Label: Foreign Family Collective / Counter Records; Format: Digital download
Streamer 2-Chōme	Released: 4 April 2019; Label: PLS&TY; Format: Digital download
Wintersleep	Released: 6 October 2017; Label: Tennyson; Format: Digital download
Telescope	Released: 31 July 2018; Label: Foreign Family Collective / Counter Records; Format: Digital download
Collapse	Released: 4 April 2019; Label: PLS&TY; Format: Digital download
Innerspace	Released: 8 October 2021; Label: College Music Records; Format: Digital download

=== Collaborations ===
Title	Details
eons away (with santpoort)	Released: 27 August 2021; Label: Friends of Friends; Format: Digital download
Pathwork (with Cabin Music)	Released: 3 November 2020; Label: Format: Digital download
Vacuum Lessons (with Anatole Muster & daniel hayn)	Released: 29 January 2021; Label: Format: Digital download

=== Remixes ===
Title	Details
Flight Facilities – Arty Boy	Released: 6 October 2017; Label: Tennyson; Format: Digital download
Kasbo – Your Tempo	Released: 31 July 2018; Label: Foreign Family Collective / Counter Records; Format: Digital download
PLS&TY – Motives	Released: 4 April 2019; Label: PLS&TY; Format: Digital download
Nicky Romero & Sick Individuals – Only For You	Released: 2 December 2020; Label: Protocol Recordings; Format: Digital download
Savel – Forgetting	Released: 29 January 2021; Label: Silent Audio; Format: Digital download
White Sea – Stranger (Skrillex Remix)	Released: 29 January 2021; Label: OWSLA; Format: Digital download
