= Wheaton Youth Center =

Community center in Wheaton, Maryland

Coordinates: 39°2′55″N 77°3′6″W

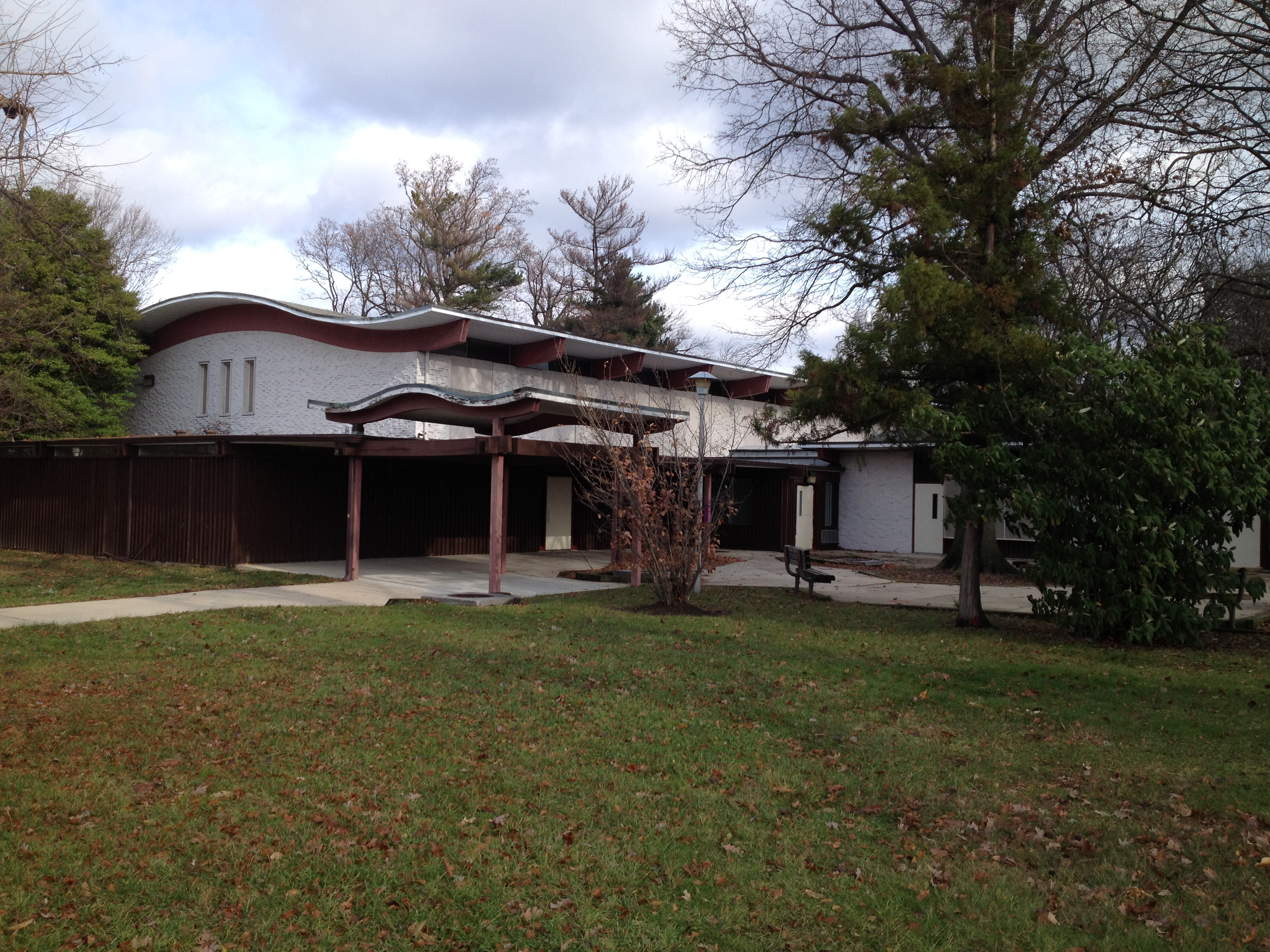
Wheaton Youth Center

The Wheaton Youth Center, also known as the Wheaton Community Recreation Center, was a building located on Georgia Avenue in Wheaton, Maryland. The space was operated by the Montgomery County Department of Recreation.

The Wheaton Youth Center opened in December 1963 and for the following decade was one of the premiere locations for the emerging suburban Maryland concert scene. Concerts at the Wheaton Youth Center were held in the gymnasium, which was located across from the Wheaton Library.

== Background ==
Besides local acts, major national and international performers played at the venue, including Grin, Fallen Angels, Alice Cooper, Bob Seger, Dr. John, Rare Earth, Rod Stewart, Iggy and the Stooges.

It is thought that Led Zeppelin performed one of their first North American concerts at the center on January 20, 1969. There are no known recordings, photographs, or any other physical evidence that the concert took place – only the recollections of radio DJ Barry Richards, who organized the show, and the small audience of approximately 50 – which has turned it into something of an urban legend. Montgomery County Executive Marc Elrich is among those who claim to have been in the crowd. Local filmmaker Jeff Krulik concluded in his 2013 documentary Led Zeppelin Played Here that the concert did likely happen, and the band includes the concert on its official timeline on its website.

The building was demolished in 2016 as part of the development plan for the combined Wheaton Regional Library and Recreation Center complex. Construction was completed and the new facility opened to the public in September 2019.
