= New Breed (song) =

Single by Joyryde featuring Darnell Williams

from the album Howsla
- Released: 5 March 2017
- Genre: Bass house; trap; hip-hop
- Length: 3:46
- Label: Owsla
- Songwriter(s): Darnell Williams
- Producer(s): John Ford

Joyryde singles chronology
| "I Ware House" (2017) | "New Breed" (2017) | "Agen Wida" (2018) |

Music video
- "New Breed" on YouTube

"New Breed" (stylised as "NEW BREED") is a song by English DJ and producer Joyryde, featuring vocals by Los Angeles–based rapper Darnell Williams. American record label Owsla released it on 5 March 2017 as part of their 12-track compilation album Howsla.

== Background and release ==
The song began production at the end of 2016 with American electronic music producer Skrillex accompanying Joyryde with the production. Although the initial project was put on hold, it wasn't until Skrillex invited Joyryde to appear on the compilation album Howsla in early 2017 when it was picked up and finished as the released project.

On 5 March 2017, the song was released for free as a digital download on international digital stores through record label Owsla, as well as being released through various music streaming services. The song was released as part of the 2017 house music–based compilation album Howsla. The album features eleven other tracks, including songs by Skrillex, Chris Lake, Alex Metric, and Wiwek. The song was released alongside a music video, being written, directed, and edited by Joyryde and stars Darnell Williams as the lead role. As of 4 April 2019, the song has gained around 1,160,000 plays on SoundCloud and over 1,040,000 views on Joyryde's YouTube channel.

== Critical reception ==
"New Breed" was well received by most critics. Impose's Andre G compared the song to its accompanying music video writing that while "the track’s shrieky synths and thumping 808s permeate, the action clip leads us to a mysterious dungeon that’s sure to stoke the suspicions of any freeze-framing conspiracy theorist who may come across it." Writing for Earmilk, Wendel Genosa described the song's sound as being a "clever merging of hip hop attitude with a house-inspired bounce to attract new audiences."Dancing Astronaut's Mary Morrison stated that Joyryde's sound and style of "bass-heavy backdrop and chopped breakdowns" were prevalent throughout the track, describing the music video as "dark and menacing, and affects a sinister vibe, illustrating an unforgiving realm of satanic rituals, guns, and violence." Writing for Billboard, Kat Bein described the song as a "deep, dark, bass-riddled house tune", writing that the song turns the "usual hip-hop gangster trope on its head." Tess McDermott of Noiseporn noted the music video as being shot from "disturbing, distorting angles with almost psychedelic effects", writing that it showcases Joyryde's film technique knowledge.

== Track listing ==
Digital download – Single
| No. | Title | Length |
|---|---|---|
| 1. | "New Breed" | 3:46 |
| Total length: | | 3:46 |

== Release history ==
| Region | Date | Format | Version | Label | Ref. |
|---|---|---|---|---|---|
| Worldwide | 5 March 2017 | Digital download | "New Breed" (feat. Darnell Williams) | Owsla | |
| Worldwide | 5 March 2017 | Digital download | Howsla | Owsla | |
