= Led Zeppelin Played Here =

Documentary about a Led Zeppelin concert in Silver Spring, Maryland

- Led Zeppelin Played Here movie poster
- Directed by: Jeff Krulik
- Release date: October 2014 (Dallas VideoFest)
- Running time: 90 minutes
- Country: United States
- Language: English

Led Zeppelin Played Here is a 2014 documentary film directed by Jeff Krulik. The film centers around the Wheaton Youth Center, in Silver Spring, Maryland, where on January 20, 1969, Led Zeppelin supposedly performed on its first US tour. There are no known recordings, photographs, or any other physical evidence that the concert took place.

Because of Krulik's inability to secure the music rights, the film has never been formally released. Krulik brings the film to whatever film festival will allow him to screen the documentary.

== Background ==
On the day of Richard Nixon's inauguration in 1969, radio DJ Barry Richards organized a Led Zeppelin concert, one of their first North American concerts, in Silver Spring, Maryland. While there is no proof that the concert occurred, Richards and the small audience of approximately 50 people say the concert happened that night. Montgomery County Executive Marc Elrich is among those who say to have been in the audience.

In 1969, there were few music venues in Montgomery County, and fewer that hosted rock acts. The Wheaton Youth Center became a popular venue for many rock acts of the time. Led Zeppelin was touring in the area, and played the Laurel Pop Festival the following month. No tickets or flyers from the Wheaton Youth Center have been found, although this may be due to the fact that the center sold tickets at the door and stamped the hands of attendees, and the show could have been promoted by Richards on his radio program. Band guitarist and founder Jimmy Page does not remember the event.

In 2009, Krulik hosted a 40th anniversary event at the Wheaton Youth Center to gather documents and memories of the concert. In the end, Krulik concludes that the concert did likely happen, and the band includes the concert on its official timeline on its website.

== See also ==
- List of Led Zeppelin songs written or inspired by others
- List of cover versions of Led Zeppelin songs
