= Kathryn Frazier =

American music publicist and entrepreneur

- Occupation: Publicist
- Years active: 1996–present
- Children: Hollis Parker Frazier-Herndon

Kathryn Frazier is an American music publicist and life coach.

== Early life ==
Kathryn Frazier was born in Michigan and was raised by a single mother.

== Career ==
In 1996, Frazier founded Biz 3, a music publicity firm. Frazier was working an office job while, in her own time, booking music bands in Chicago. Through a friend, Frazier learned about doing press for artists and decided to try it herself by creating her own company. The company has since expanded to Los Angeles. Frazier has represented a diverse roster of over 200 artists, including Daft Punk, The Weeknd, Skrillex, Justin Bieber, J. Cole, Lil Baby, Lauryn Hill, Migos, Chappell Roan, Victoria Monét, Lil Yachty, Megan Thee Stallion, Jessie Reyez, Colin Kaepernick, Diplo, and RAYE.

In 2011, she co-founded OWSLA, an independent record label and creative collective, alongside Skrillex and collaborators. OWSLA's first release was Porter Robinson's Spitfire.

Frazier is a certified life and career coach, specializing in personal development, executive coaching, and family dynamics. She is also a Reiki master and a lecturer at the UCLA Herb Alpert School of Music.

== Personal life ==
Frazier lives in Los Angeles, California. Her home burned down in the Eaton Fire in 2025. She has two sons, including Hollis Frazier Herndon, an artist known by the stage name "2hollis".
