= Laurel Pop Festival =

- Genre: Rock, pop, etc.
- Dates: July 11–12, 1969
- Locations: Laurel, MD; United States
- Years active: 1969

The Laurel Pop Festival was a music festival held at the Laurel Race Course in Laurel, Maryland, on July 11–12, 1969.

== Background ==
The festival featured Buddy Guy, Al Kooper, Jethro Tull, Johnny Winter, Edwin Hawkins Singers and Led Zeppelin (on July 11); and Jeff Beck, Ten Years After, Sly and the Family Stone, The Mothers of Invention, Savoy Brown and The Guess Who (on July 12).

On July 12, there was a significant rainstorm which delayed the opening set by two hours. As a result, Savoy Brown did not perform.

Despite its line-up of top flight acts, the festival remains unheralded and somewhat forgotten. It took place one month before Woodstock.

== See also ==
- List of music festivals in the United States
- List of historic rock festivals
- Led Zeppelin Played Here
