= Jeff Krulik =

Director of independent films and a former Discovery Channel producer

- Born: United States
- Occupation(s): Film director, film producer, author

Jeff Krulik is a director of independent films and a former Discovery Channel producer. Krulik's work frequently explores the fringes of popular culture from an enthusiastic and appreciative point of view.

He is best known for his 1986 documentary Heavy Metal Parking Lot, co-produced by John Heyn, a gently disturbing (but, for the most part, fun-loving) look into hard-rock fandom recorded at the Capital Centre parking lot in Landover, Maryland, before a Judas Priest concert. Most of the fans appear drunken and drugged, with "bare feet, muscle shirts, bare-chested, bleach blonde frizzy perms, mullets from hell, big hair, bad teeth, scar tissue, and by far the largest collection of late '70s Camaros ever seen in one location." Cult director John Waters said of the film, "It gave me the creeps."

== Background ==
Heavy Metal Parking Lot, for a decade or more, circulated through word-of-mouth, via the internet and on second-to-nth-generation bootlegged copies. A 20th-anniversary DVD edition with sequels, outtakes, where-are-they-now bonus footage and other inspirations is now available for sale.

In his first professional position, Krulik served as the Metrovision Public-access television cable TV channel coordinator for the southern portion of Prince George's County, Maryland, a community that has inspired several of his films, including Public Access Gibberish (1990), a "greatest hits" montage of the most bizarre acts during his tenure at the cable access channel. Other films are Neil Diamond Parking Lot (1996), about the fans before a Neil Diamond concert at the same stadium as Heavy Metal Parking Lot, one decade later; and Ernest Borgnine on the Bus (1997), a documentary about actor Ernest Borgnine, his son and his custom RV; a compilation of many of the director's short films titled Heavy Metal Parking Lot: The Films of Jeff Krulik was released several years ago. Most of these films, along with films made by Krulik's friends and some additional found footage, are viewable for free in streaming formats on his official website.

In 2004, the Trio cable channel began broadcasting a show by Krulik titled Parking Lot, which expanded on the "parking lot" documentary series started in the 1980s. Created & co-produced by Jeff Krulik and John Heyn (in association with Radical Media), eight episodes were filmed, although it is unclear as to how many of them were actually broadcast. It does not appear that the program will be shown again on the channel.

In 2010 Jeff released Heavy Metal Picnic, edited by Greg DeLiso, a feature-length, semi-follow-up to Parking Lot. Picnic chronicles the goings on at a weekend-long field party in Potomac, Maryland in 1985. The party was captured on video by a few of the patrons wielding a VHS camcorder and a stolen CBS microphone. Jeff interviews the men behind the camera, the party's organizer and some of the attendees, who had not previously seen the footage. Heavy Metal Picnic was released on August 6, 2010.

Krulik also directed Led Zeppelin Played Here, about a Maryland youth center where Led Zeppelin supposedly performed on its first US tour.

== Filmography ==
- The Scott And Gary Show (1983–1989)
- Forestville Rocks (1985)
- TVs From Outer Space (1985)
- Heavy Metal Parking Lot (1986) (co-directed by John Heyn)
- Memories of Elvis (1987)
- You Gotta Get a Gimmick (1987)
- An Afternoon with Zippy the Chimp (1988)
- Boxing Night (1988)
- Monster Truck Parking Lot (unfinished) (1988)
- Rock 'n' Roll Psychosis (1988)
- Show Us Your Belly (1988)
- Twenty-Five Cents Before Noon (1988)
- We Need a Staple Gun (1988)
- Public Access Gibberish (1990)
- Ilana Solomon Sings (1993)
- ? (1995)
- Mr. Blassie Goes to Washington (1995)
- Hop On The Bus Gus (1996)
- King of Porn (1996)
- Most Entertaining Person on Planet Earth (1996)
- Meet Fanboy (1996)
- Ernest Borgnine on the Bus (1997)
- Go-Go Girls Don't Cry (1997)
- Katie Bar the Door: The Goodwill Book Sale (1997)
- King of the Freaks (trailer) (1997)
- Neil Diamond Parking Lot (work in progress) (1997)
- Thank You Roma (1997–2000)
- Follow That @#*! Torch (1998)
- Heavy Metal Parking Lot: The Lost Footage (1998)
- Legend of Forrest Tucker (trailer) (1998)
- Neil Diamond Parking Lot (1998)
- Wanna Watch? (trailer) (1998)
- I Created Lancelot Link (1999)
- Jewish Film Festival Trailers (1999)
- Memo from Reidy (1999)
- First Edition Barbara (2000)
- Harry Potter Parking Lot (2000)
- Jeff's People (2000)
- King Of Porn 2: The Retirement (2000)
- Obsessed With Jews (2000)
- Pancake (2000)
- Urology for Big Daddy (2001)
- Jeff Krulik Picks the Weasel (2002)
- Hitler's Hat (2003)
- Heavy Metal Picnic (2010)
- Kentucky Confidential (2011)
- Led Zeppelin Played Here (2014)
- Tales of Belair at Bowie (2019)
- We Are Fugazi from Washington D.C. (2023) (co-curated by Joe Gross and Joseph Pattisall)
- Razz (The) Documentary (2023) (co-directed by Richard Taylor)

=== Demo reels ===
- Animal Man
- Welcome to Planet Krulik
