= Gary Richards (music executive) =

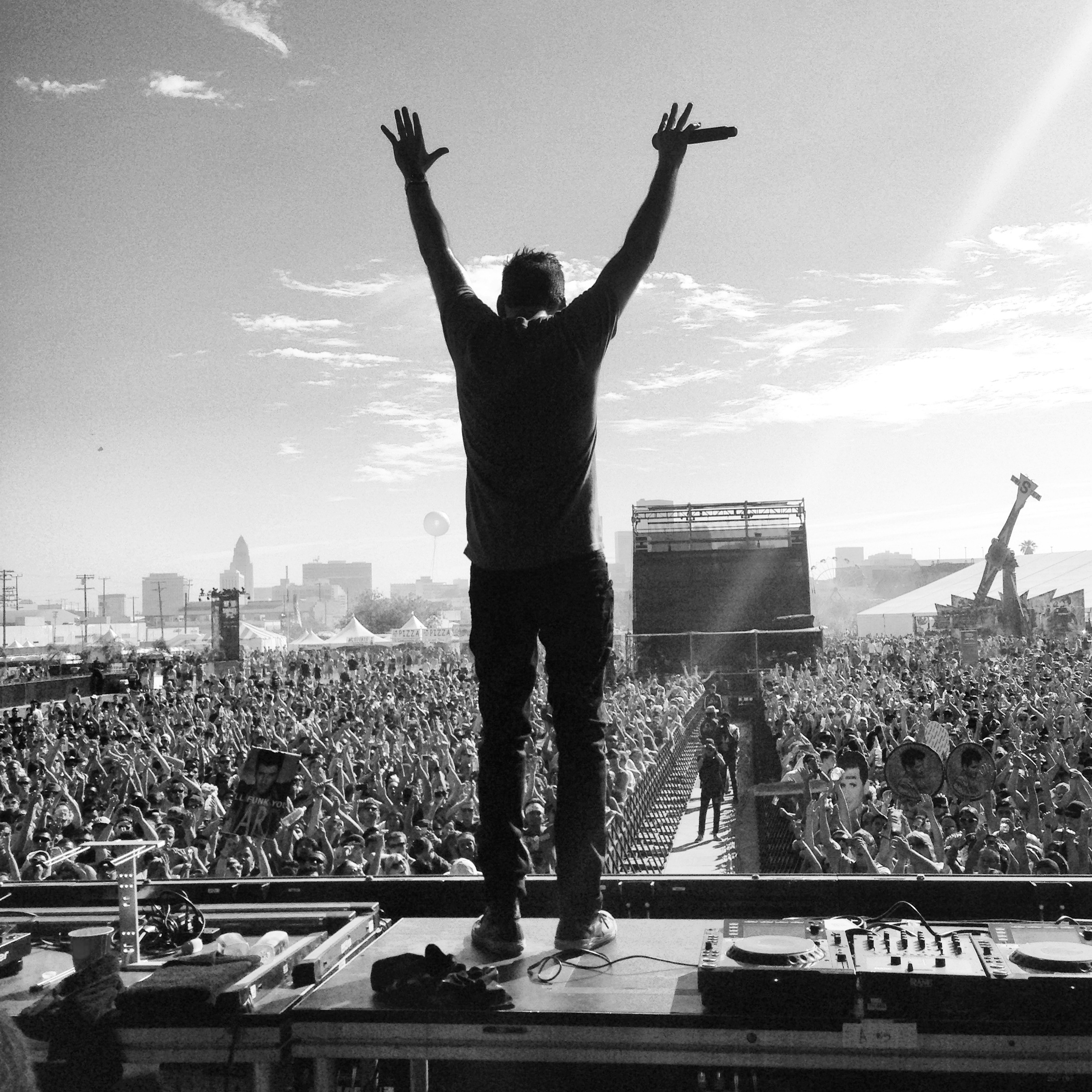
- Destructo at HARD Summer 2013 in Los Angeles, CA

Background information
- Also known as: Destructo
- Born: December 31, 1970 (age 55); Washington, D.C., U.S.
- Genres: Electronic, ghetto house, tech house, electro house
- Occupations: Music executive, dj
- Years active: 1991–Present
- Labels: Interscope Records, Boysnoize Records, Owsla, HITS HARD
- Website: djdestructo.com

Gary Richards (born December 31, 1970), known by his stage name Destructo, is an American music executive, concert promoter, and DJ. As of September 1, 2017, he is the president of LiveStyle, North America. Prior to joining LiveStyle, he was the founder and CEO of HARD Events, a brand which has put on popular music festivals since 2007 and was subsequently purchased by Live Nation Entertainment in 2012. He has performed professionally as a DJ under the name Destructo for over 20 years, touring across the world. He is credited with being a leader in the electronic music genre in North America, helping to bring artists like Deadmau5 and Justice into the mainstream. Richards is included on Rolling Stone's "50 Most Important People in EDM" list, Billboard's "EDM Power Players" lists from 2014 to 2017, and inthemix's list of the "50 Most Powerful People in EDM IN 2013 As Destructo, he has released four EP's titled Technology, Higher, West Coast, and RENEGADE respectively.

== Early life ==
Richards grew up in Washington, D.C. He received significant exposure to the music industry as a child as his father, Barry "Reazar" Richards worked on the radio and in concert promotion. He began to attend concerts with his father around the age of 10. The artists he saw live include Led Zeppelin and Alice Cooper. His family moved to New Orleans, Louisiana, and then to Myrtle Beach, South Carolina, where he worked as an on-air radio personality. The family then moved to Los Angeles, California, where he started performing as a DJ.

== Career ==
=== Concert promotion and A&R ===
Entranced by the early 1990s warehouse scene, Richards hosted a weekly event of his own called "The Sermon" and helped bring attention to many L.A. nightlife hotspots including the Standard Hotel – Downtown. He organized his first major music event titled "Magical Mickey's Holy Water Adventure" at Wild Rivers (water park) in Irvine, CAlifornia, in 1991. For the next two years, Richards produced monthly events including the first two "Electric Daisy Carnivals" in 1991 and 1992. In 1997, Richards allowed promoter Pasquale Rotella to use the "Electric Daisy Carnival" name for a series of music festivals he was producing. The festival, commonly referred to as the "EDC" is one of the most popular electronic music festivals in the USA. He followed "Electric Daisy Carnival" with presenting "RaveAmerica" at Knott's Berry Farm in Buena Park, California, on New Year's Eve, 1993. Gaining reputation in the music industry Richards was chosen by Rick Rubin to handle A&R duties for the Electronic music division at Def American Recordings, where he signed and developed Lords of Acid, XL Recordings, Messiah, Digital Orgasm, Harthouse Records and God Lives Underwater. Before establishing his own record labels Nitrus Records and 1500 Records which released music from Kill The Noise, Whitey, David Holmes, Überzone, Dub Pistols, Ugly Duckling, Depeche Mode tribute album For the Masses, and the original motion picture soundtrack for 15 Minutes.

=== Destructo ===
In the mid-1990s, Gary Richards began performing as a DJ under the name Destructo. He is quoted as saying that the Destructo name derives from his "goal to play the hardest and most gnarly techno out there" stating that he would "blow up the sound system and the mixer at clubs if I could".He listed electronic artists Kraftwerk and Daft Punk as inspirations along with metal bands Metallica and Black Sabbath. He has released remixes for Warren G, Depeche Mode, Major Lazer, YG, White Zombie, Digitalism, and others. In 2012 he released his debut EP titled Technology.

Destructo's second EP titled Higher was released on June 10, 2013, via Owsla/Boysnoize Records and featured remixes by Tommy Trash and Brodinski. The music video for the EP's title track was directed by Agata Alexander.

On November 24, 2014, Destructo released the West Coast EP on Interscope Records which featured appearances by YG, Problem, Ty Dolla Sign, Kurupt, Too Short, and Warren G. This release took the producer towards in the realm of G-House and introduced his singular solo style. His fourth EP RENEGADE was released on March 31, 2017, on his label HITS HARD. It featured collaborations with E-40 and Too $hort, Ty Dolla $ign & iLoveMakonnen Pusha T & Starrah, Problem and Freddie Gibbs. In 2018, Destructo hit the road on his "Let’s Be Friends" Tour, kicking off his tour on Friday, January 19 at the Output in Brooklyn, NY. Continuing his tour with 15 more dates in cities across North America.

=== HARD Events ===
As the music industry continued to change at the turn of the century, Richards returned to his roots as a concert promoter, launching the very first HARD Events festival in 2007. The festival's success soon lead Gary Richards and HARD Events to become a major player in EDM concert promotion, and by 2010, the company was hosting 3 major music festivals, as well as numerous club and theater shows across the United States. In 2012, HARD Events was acquired by Live Nation Entertainment with the intent of expanding its music events into new international markets.

It is estimated that HARD Events draw a cumulative audience of more than 100,000 people per year to its events, drawing as many as 150,000 to its two-day festival in 2016. Past performers at HARD Events festivals include Deadmau5, Skrillex, Underworld, Diplo, M.I.A., Justice, A-Trak, Steve Aoki, Busy P, Boys Noize, N.E.R.D., Crystal Castles, Digitalism, and many more.

=== LiveStyle ===
On September 5, 2017, Randy Phillips, President/CEO of LiveStyle, Inc. announced that Gary Richards had joined the company as President of LiveStyle North America. In this newly created position at LiveStyle, Richards became responsible for working with all of LiveStyle's current U.S. festival operations, developing and launching new brands and activities on the West Coast. North American key operating entities for the company include Made Event, React Presents, Disco Donnie Presents, Life in Color, and MMG, along with festivals and brands such as Electric Zoo, Spring Awakening, TomorrowWorld, Sensation, and Life in Color.

== Personal life ==
In 2003, he married Anne Varnishung, a model. They have two children.

== Discography ==
Title	Album details
F**king S**t Up	Released: 2018; Label: Hits HARD; Artist: Destructo & Busta Rhymes
Shots to the Dome	Released: 2018; Label: Hits HARD; Artist: Destructo & Gerry Gonza
Loaded	Released: 2017; Label: Hits HARD; Artist: Destructo – feat. Yo Gotti
Bassface	Released: 2017; Label: Hits HARD; Artist: Destructo
All Nite Remixes	Released: 2017; Label: Hits HARD; Artist: Destructo – feat. E40 & Too $hort
Renegade EP	Released: 2017; Label: Hits HARD; Artist: Destructo
Catching Plays	Released: 2016; Label: Hits HARD; Artist: DDestructo x Wax Motif – feat. Pusha T & Starch
Techno	Released: 2016; Label: Bunny Tiger; Artist: Destructo
Beat Down	Released: 2016; Label: Night Bass; Artist: Destructo x Wax Motif – feat. Vanilla Ace
4Real	Released: 2016; Label: Hits HARD; Artist: Destructo feat. Ty Dolla $ign and ILoveMakonnen
Bodyback	Released: 2015; Label: Night Bass; Artist: Destructo
West Coast EP	Released: November 24, 2014; Label: Interscope Records
Higher	Released: June 10, 2013; Label: Owsla/Boysnoize Records
Technology	Released: April 9, 2012; Label: Boysnoize Records

=== Select remixes ===
Year	Artist	Album	Details
2021	Dolly Parton	"Jolene" (Destructo remix)	Producer, Remixer
2015	Carmada	On Fire (Destructo & Bot remix)	Producer, Remixer
2015	Sharam Jey, Sammy W & Alex E	SWAG! (Destructo & Bot remix)	Producer, Remixer
2015	Warren G feat. Nate Dogg	Regulate (Destructo & Wax Motif remix)	Producer, Remixer
2014	YG	"My N***A" (Destructo & Wax Motif remix)	Producer, Remixer
2014	Henry Fong	"Stand Up" (Destructo remix)	Producer, Remixer
2013	Giorgio Moroder	"Chase" (Destructo re-edit)	Producer, Remixer
2013	Depeche Mode	Soothe My Soul (Destructo remix)	Producer, Remixer
2012	Rob Zombie	Thunder Kiss '65 (Destructo remix)	Producer, Remixer
2012	Strip Steve	Astral (Destructo remix – Boys Noize edit)	Producer, Remixer
2011	Digitalism	Reeperbahn (Destructo remix)	Producer, Remixer
2010	Major Lazer	Bruk Out (Destructo/Uberzone remix)	Producer, Remixer
2009	Rick James	Super Freak (Destructo remix)	Producer, Remixer
