= Manslaughter (song) =

2013 song by Lets Be Friends

Single by Lets Be Friends

from the album Lets Be Friends EP 1
- Released: 17 January 2013 (original mix); 19 August 2013 (VIP mix)
- Genre: Electro house (original mix); Moombahton (VIP mix)
- Length: 5:35 (original mix); 5:22 (VIP mix)
- Label: Unwanted (original mix); Monstercat (VIP mix)
- Producer(s): John Ford; ( Oren Emanuel

Lets Be Friends singles chronology
"Best In the West" (2013)	"Manslaughter" (2013)	"FTW" (2014)

Alternative cover
- Cover art for the VIP mix released by Monstercat

"Manslaughter" is a song by electronic music duo Lets Be Friends, consisting of English DJ and producer John Ford and Israeli electronic music producer Oren Emanuel. They self-released the song under their record label Unwanted on 17 January 2013. The song was released as part of the duo's debut extended play Lets Be Friends EP 1, released on 8 July 2013. The song's voice clips are sampled from a stand-up comedy routine by Brian Regan.

A VIP mix of the song was later released by Canadian record label Monstercat released it on 19 August 2013. The song was originally released as part of the compilation album Monstercat 014 – Discovery, released 2 September 2013. It was later featured as part of Monstercat's Best of 2013 compilation album, released on 19 December 2013.

== Background and release ==
On 17 January 2013, the song was released as a digital download on international digital stores through Lets Be Friends' own record label Unwanted, as well as being released through various music streaming services. The song was released as part of Lets Be Friends' debut extended play Lets Be Friends EP 1, released on 8 July 2013.

On 19 August 2013, a VIP mix of the song was released through record label Monstercat. "Manslaughter" (VIP mix) was featured on the compilation album titled Monstercat 014 – Discovery released on 2 September 2013. The song was later featured on the yearly best-of compilation album titled Monstercat – Best of 2013 released on 19 December 2013. As of 15 June 2019, the VIP mix of the song has gained around 740,000 plays on SoundCloud and over 3,020,000 views on Monstercat's Uncaged YouTube channel.

== Critical reception ==
"Manslaughter" was well received by most critics. While reviewing the extended play, Brett Edgerly of Your EDM touched on the song, calling it a "solid track fit for peak hours and is guaranteed to get the energy going with its unique namesake sampled intro" and reminiscent of English electronic music artist Far Too Loud. Writing for The Untz, Chris Schwarzkopf noted it as similar to "One Click Headshot" by British DJ Feed Me or as "IDGAFOS" by American DJ and record producer Dillon Francis, calling it the Tony Jaa of electronic dance music. EDM Sauce's Steven Jacobs wrote that the two producers "really hit it hard on this one" and called the drop "gory."

The VIP Mix was also fairly well received, with a Your EDM writer called the VIP mix just "as hard-hitting as the original while still sounding amazingly different." an EDMTunes writer also compared it to the original mix, writing that the" VIP mix takes it to the next level of bass madness" and that it is "definitely one of those tracks that you just can’t get out of your head."

== Track listing ==
Digital download – Single
No.	Title	Length
1.	"Manslaughter"	5:35
Total length:		5:35

Digital download – Single
No.	Title	Length
1.	"Manslaughter" (VIP mix)	5:22
Total length:		5:22

== Release history ==
Region	Date	Format	Version	Label	Ref.
Worldwide	17 January 2013	Digital download	"Manslaughter"	Unwanted	
Worldwide	8 July 2013	Digital download	Lets Be Friends EP 1	Unwanted	
Worldwide	19 August 2013	Digital download	"Manslaughter" (VIP mix)	Monstercat	
Worldwide	2 September 2013	Digital download	Monstercat 014 – Discovery	Monstercat	
Worldwide	19 December 2013	Digital download	Monstercat – The Best of 2013	Monstercat	
