= Owsla =

American record label

- Parent company: Warner Music Group
- Founded: August 17, 2011
- Founder: Skrillex; Tim Smith; Kathryn Frazier; Clayton Blaha
- Distributor: Atlantic
- Genre: EDM; house; trap; dubstep; bass
- Country of origin: United States
- Location: Los Angeles, California
- Official website: owsla.com

Owsla (/ˈaʊslə/ OWSS-lə; stylized in all caps) is an American record label and creative collective. It was founded by Skrillex, Tim Smith, Kathryn Frazier, and Clayton Blaha in 2011. Skrillex announced the label on August 17, 2011. The label's first release was Porter Robinson's Spitfire.

The name "Owsla" is a reference to Richard Adams' fantasy novel Watership Down, in which it refers to the governing caste in a society of wild rabbits.

== History ==
In 2012, Owsla launched a monthly subscription, The Nest, with benefits including early access to Owsla releases. In 2013, Bromance Records partnered up with Owsla to create an American branch titled Bromance US with releases from Gesaffelstein, Illangelo, Brodinski and LOUISAHHH!!!. A year later, Owsla launched the Nestivus Charity Campaign, a series of holiday initiatives with all proceeds going to the international music nonprofit, Bridges for Music.

On September 18, 2016, Owsla celebrated five years of establishment with a party in Los Angeles. In a video published by Owsla, Skrillex spoke about the establishment. He said "I make music 'cause I love music and it all starts from there. And I surround myself with good people that I believe in as well. I think it’s important to create your family." The General Manager of Owsla, Blaise DeAngelo asserted that Skrillex previously, like many other artists, had issues with record labels, implying that it caused him to create his own. Owsla was described as a label started for electronic music artists who "couldn’t get good label deals or resources and support they needed."

Porter Robinson's Spitfire was the label's debut release. Releases that followed, such as Zedd’s Shave It, Gesaffelstein’s Aleph and What So Not’s Jaguar, were described as prominent. Owsla Head of A&R Chris Morris explained that "In order for an artist to be signed, there has to be that passion from the top down," asserting that it is an "artist-driven" company. On May 5, 2017, Owsla released an annual compilation album, Howsla. It was described by Pitchfork as "a focused take that’s largely modeled on bassline house, a style from the northern UK that’s distinguished by greasy low-end melodies, hard-thwacked drums, and a slippery, skippy sense of swing." Subsidiaries of Owsla include Nest HQ, a website dedicated to giving exposure to electronic music artists and Owsla Goods, a 'fashion wing'.

== Key people ==
- Sonny Moore (Skrillex) – founder, chief executive officer
- Tim Smith – co-founder, artist manager
- Kathryn Frazier – co-founder, publicist
- Clayton Blaha – co-founder, director of artists and repertoire (A&R)
- Chris Morris – head of A&R
- Blaise DeAngelo – former general manager

== Artists ==
- Bassnectar
- Birdy Nam Nam
- BloodPop
- Dylan Brady
- Carmada
- Crookers
- Destructo
- Dog Blood
- Ekali
- Elohim
- Figure
- From First to Last
- Dillon Francis
- Salvatore Ganacci
- Gesaffelstein
- Getter
- Ghastly
- HeartsRevolution
- Hundred Waters
- I Am Legion
- I See Monstas
- Jack Beats
- Jack Ü
- Joyryde
- Valentino Khan
- Kill the Noise
- KOAN Sound
- Chris Lake
- Loudpvck
- Anna Lunoe
- The M Machine
- Marshmello
- Alex Metric
- Mija
- Moody Good
- Must Die!
- josh pan
- Pennybirdrabbit
- Alvin Risk
- Porter Robinson
- Route 94
- Rusko
- Seven Lions
- Showtek
- Sirah
- Skream
- Skrillex
- Snails
- Star Slinger
- Sub Focus
- TC
- Teddy Killerz
- Tennyson
- TroyBoi
- Vindata
- Virtual Riot
- What So Not
- Wiwek
- Zedd
