= Hard (music festival) =

American music festival

HARD FEST
- Genre: Electronic, techno, alternative dance, electronic dance music, hip hop, dance-punk, dubstep, house
- Location: United States
- Years active: 2007 -
- Website: hardfest.com

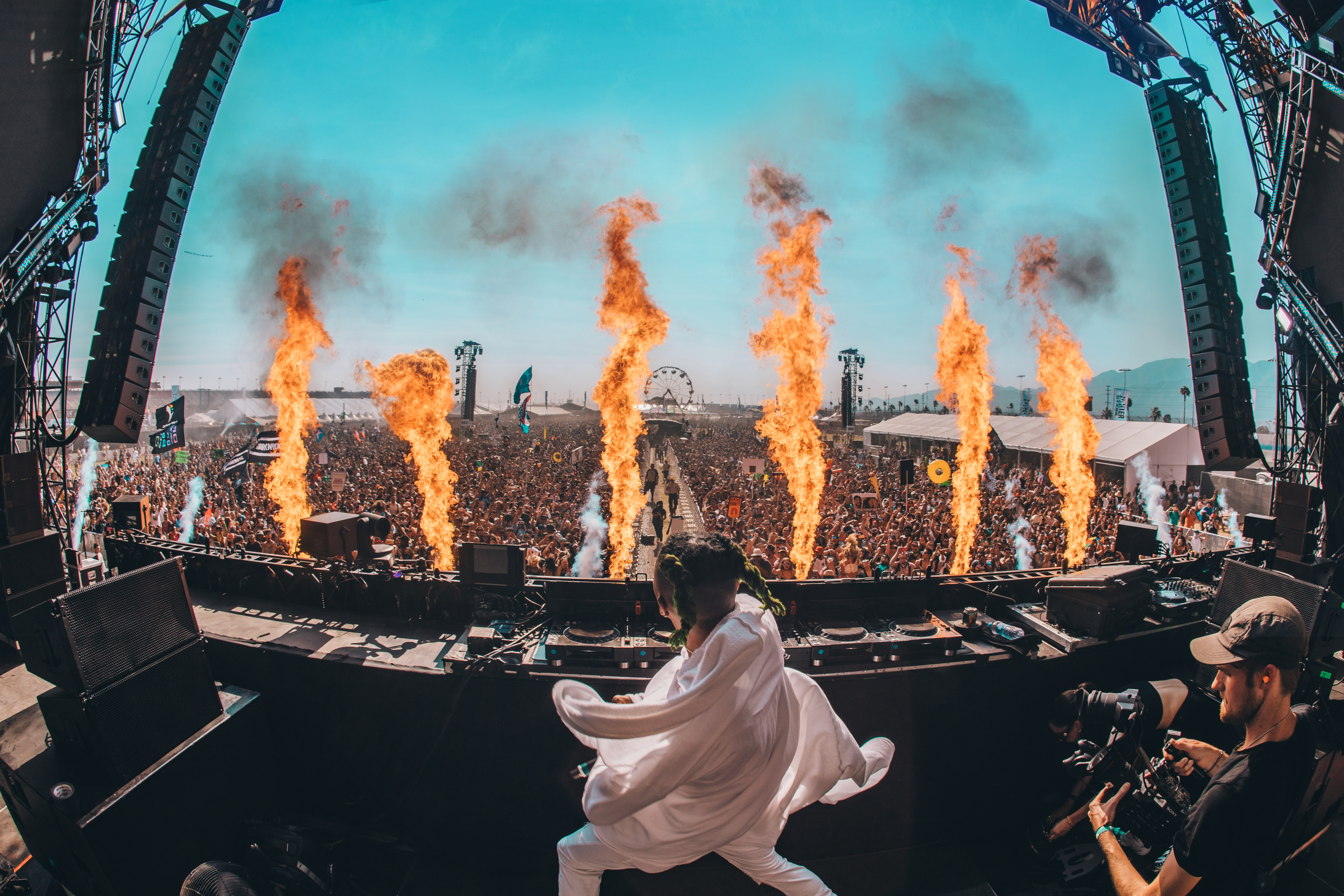
SAYMYNAME performing live with pyrotechnics at a Hard music festival

Hard is an American music festival, music cruise and concert brand founded in 2007. The event line-ups consist of alternative and electronic acts and emerging talents. The first Hard Music Festival was held on December 31, 2007, in Downtown Los Angeles and featured Justice, Peaches and 2 Live Crew. Hard is best known for the Hard Summer Music Festival and Hard Haunted Mansion, though also runs several smaller events and one-off shows. Hard is sometimes called "Hardfest" by fans, based on the event's website and social media shortcuts. Additional Hard brands include the Hard Summer, Hard Red Rocks, Hard at Electric Daisy Carnival, and the Holy Ship! electronic music cruise, and former events include Hard Day of The Dead, Hard 13, Turkey Soup and Hard Miami. Live Nation Entertainment acquired Hard in 2012. In 2013, Live Nation handed control over to Insomniac Events in their merger.

== Hard Summer Music Festival ==
Since 2008, Hard has run an annual Hard Summer Music Festival. The first was held on July 19, 2008, in Downtown Los Angeles at the Shrine Exposition Hall. In 2009, Hard Summer changed venues to The Forum. The Inglewood police department and fire marshals were forced to shut the event because it was declared a "hazard" by the fire department. In 2010, the venue changes to again to the Los Angeles State Historic Park, where it continued to be held until 2014, when it moved to the Whittier Narrows Recreation Area in El Monte, California. In 2015 Hard Summer once again switched venues to the Fairplex in Pomona, California.

In 2016, Hard Summer moved to the Fontana Auto Club Speedway and hosted around 146,000 people. For its 10th anniversary in 2017, the festival was set to return to the Auto Club Speedway; however, after a notable decline in ticket sales, LiveNation moved the event to Glen Helen Amphitheater in San Bernardino, California. About 80,000 people attended the two day weekend. Hard Summer 2018 returned to the Auto Club Speedway in August 2018, where it remained in 2019.

In 2020, Hard Summer was cancelled due to the COVID-19 pandemic. The festival resumed in 2021, and moved location to the NOS Event Center in San Bernardino, where it remained in 2022. In 2023, Insomniac stated that the event would be held at the Los Angeles Memorial Coliseum, Exposition Park, and BMO Stadium, making it the first time since 2010 that a major Insomniac event was hosted in Los Angeles. In 2024, the location was changed to SoFi Stadium.

== Hard Red Rocks ==
In March 2013, Hard Events announced that it would be hosting a new event in Colorado called Hard Red Rocks at the Red Rocks Amphitheatre. The event took place on August first of that year, and has returned to that event annually. Hard Red Rocks 2018 is set to take place on August second feature guests including DJ Snake, Virtual Self, Mija, GG MAGREE, and Hekler.

== National and International Tours ==
=== 2007 Hard New Year's Eve Music Festival ===
Date	City	Country	Venue	Line-up
December 31, 2007	Downtown Los Angeles	United States	Downtown LA Arts District Premier Events Center, Los Angeles	Justice (Dj Set), 2 Live Crew, Steve Aoki, Busy P, Dj A-Track, Whitey, Uberzone, Jason Bentley, Wired All Wrong, Young Americans, Softlightes, Trouble Andrew, Pink Enemy, Afrobots, Royal Palms, Dj Pubes (Obey Giant), Mid City West, Dj Skeet Skeet, Gina Turner Vs. Louisahh, Aaron Castle, Goddollars, Kool Aid, Destructo, Dj Jacques, On-Blast

=== 2010 Hard Summer Tour ===
August 2010 marked the launch of the Hard Summer Tour, as promoter Gary Richards decided to take the party on the road; 12 dates scattered across the United States and Canada; Incorporating hip-hop into the fold.

Date	City	Country	Venue	Line-up
August 6, 2010	Oakland	United States	Fox Theater	Crystal Castles, Rusko, Sinden, Proxy
August 9, 2010	Denver	United States	Ogden Theater	Crystal Castles, Rusko, Sinden, Proxy, Destructo
August 11, 2010	Austin	United States	Stubb's Waller Creek Amphitheater	Crystal Castles, Rusko, Sinden, Proxy, Destructo
August 13, 2010	Chicago	United States	Congress Theater	Crystal Castles, Rusko, Sinden, The Twelves, Destructo
August 14, 2010	Toronto	Canada	Koolhaus	Crystal Castles, Rusko, Sinden, Destructo
August 15, 2010	Montreal	Canada	Metropolis	Crystal Castles, Rusko, Sinden, Destructo
August 17, 2010	Boston	United States	House of Blues	Crystal Castles, Rusko, Sinden, Destructo
August 18, 2010	Philadelphia	United States	Electric Factory	Crystal Castles, Rusko, Sinden, Destructo
August 20, 2010	Washington, D.C.	United States	9:30 Club	Crystal Castles, Rusko, Sinden, Destructo
August 21, 2010	New York City	United States	Terminal 5	Crystal Castles, Sinden, Destructo
August 22, 2010	Baltimore	United States	Sonar	Crystal Castles, Rusko, Sinden, Destructo

=== 2011 ===
Trent Reznor helped organise the event, seeking out the help of out Gary Richards from Hard to do so, stating: "I’ve always respected what [Richards] does with Hard, and I thought that was exactly what we needed."

Date	City	Country	Venue	Line-up
Hard x Mouth Taped Shut
December 3, 2011	Stockholm	Sweden	Sturecompagniet	Miike Snow Sound System, Chase & Status (DJ Set), Noisia, Alex Metric
December 9, 2011	Chicago	United States	Congress	Sebastian Ingrosso, James Murphy, Proxy, DJ Eye
December 10, 2011	New York City	United States	Terminal 5	The Bloody Beetroots (DJ Set), James Murphy, Proxy, DJ Eye
December 16, 2011	London	England	Coronet	Groove Armada, Labyrinth, Zane Lowe, Beardyman, Madeon
December 16, 2011	San Francisco	United States	Warfield	Major Lazer, James Murphy, Proxy, DJ Eye
December 17, 2011	Los Angeles	United States	Palladium	deadmau5, James Murphy, Proxy, DJ Eye
Hard Summer Tour
August 3, 2011	Seattle	United States	Showbox Sodo	Digitalism (live), Jack Beats, Destructo
August 4, 2011	Portland	United States	Roseland	Digitalism (live), Jack Beats, Destructo
August 5, 2011	Oakland	United States	Fox Theater	Digitalism (live), Jack Beats, Destructo
August 6, 2011	Los Angeles	United States	Los Angeles State Historic Park	Hard Summer Music Festival
August 8, 2011	El Paso	United States	Club 101	Digitalism (live), Jack Beats, Destructo
August 9, 2011	Dallas	United States	Granada	Digitalism (live), Jack Beats, Destructo
August 10, 2011	Austin	United States	Stubb's	Digitalism (live), Jack Beats, Destructo
August 12, 2011	Chicago	United States	Congress	Digitalism (live), Jack Beats, Destructo
August 13, 2011	Toronto	Canada	WEMF @ Madawaska Park	Digitalism (live), Jack Beats, Destructo
August 14, 2011	Montreal	Canada	Metropolis	Digitalism (live), Destructo
August 16, 2011	Boston	United States	House of Blues	Digitalism (live), Switch, Designer Drugs, Destructo
August 17, 2011	Baltimore	United States	Bourbon Street	Digitalism (live), Destructo, Dillon Francis
August 18, 2011	Philadelphia	United States	Electric Factory	Digitalism (live), Switch, Designer Drugs, Destructo
August 19, 2011	Washington, D.C.	United States	9:30 Club	Digitalism (live), Switch, Destructo, Dillon Francis
August 20, 2011	New York City	United States	Terminal 5	Digitalism (live), Switch, Designer Drugs, Destructo

=== 2012 Hard presents Boys Noize Live ===
Date	City	Country	Venue	Line-up
November 23, 2012	Fort Lauderdale	United States	Revolution	Boys Noize, Djedjotronic
November 24, 2012	Orlando	United States	House of Blues	Boys Noize (Canceled)
November 28, 2012	Washington, D.C.	United States	Fillmore	Boys Noize (Canceled)
November 30, 2012	New York City	United States	Roseland Ballroom	Boys Noize, Spank Rock, Djedjotronic, UZ
December 1, 2012	Philadelphia	United States	TLA	Boys Noize, Djedjotronic, Love City DJS, Sammy Slice
December 2, 2012	Boston	United States	House of Blues	Boys Noize, Djedjotronic
December 6, 2012	Montreal	Canada	Telus Theatre	Boys Noize, Djedjotronic, Jordan Dare, Mayday
December 7, 2012	Toronto	Canada	Sound Academy	Boys Noize, DJedjotronic, Mark Hinnen, Rynecologist
December 8, 2012	Chicago	United States	House of Blues	Boys Noize, Djedjotronic, Le1f
December 10, 2012	St. Louis	United States	Pageant	Boys Noize, Strip Steve
December 14, 2012	Oakland	United States	Fox Theatre	Boys Noize, Strip Steve, Le1f
December 15, 2012	Los Angeles	United States	The Hollywood Palladium	Boys Noize, UZ, Destructo, Strip Steve, Le1f
December 16, 2012	San Diego	United States	House of Blues	Boys Noize, Strip Steve, Destructo
December 18, 2012	Denver	United States	Fillmore	Boys Noize, Strip Steve
December 20, 2012	Dallas	United States	House of Blues	Boys Noize (Canceled)
December 21, 2012	Houston	United States	House of Blues	Boys Noize

=== 2014 Hard Straylia ===
Date	City	Country	Venue	Line-up
April 24, 2014	Melbourne	Australia	The Hi-Fi	Clockwork, Destructo, Oliver, Motez (producer)
April 25, 2014	Sydney	Australia	The Ivy	Clockwork, Destructo, Oliver, Motez (producer)
April 26, 2014	Adelaide	Australia	Thebarton Theatre	Clockwork, Destructo, Oliver, Motez (producer)
April 27, 2014	Fremantle	Australia	Port Beach Sand Tracks	RL Grime, Destructo, Oliver, Motez (producer)

== See also ==
- List of electronic music festivals
