= Nedrow =

Nedrow can refer to:

- Nedrow, New York, U.S., a hamlet
- Rachael Nedrow, an American YouTuber whose voice was sampled in the 2010 Skrillex song Scary Monsters and Nice Sprites
