= List of The Late Late Show episodes (2015 guest hosts) =

- No. of episodes: 45 (incl. 5 episodes of The Talk)

Release
- Original network: CBS

Season chronology
- ← Previous; 2014 Craig Ferguson episodes Next → 2015 James Corden episodes

This is the list of episodes for The Late Late Show in 2015 with guest hosts. Guest hosts were scheduled to helm the program between the end of Craig Ferguson's tenure as host in December 2014 and the beginning of James Corden's tenure on March 23, 2015. In this transitional period, the show continued to be co-produced by Worldwide Pants and the staff was mostly made up of holdovers from Ferguson's era. The off-camera announcer continued to be Shadoe Stevens, except for the week of New York shows, where another announcer was used. The executive producer remained Peter Lassally, however the show was produced by newcomer Jeff Stilson, formerly of The Daily Show with Jon Stewart, Late Show with David Letterman and Lopez Tonight. The writing staff consisted of Stilson along with Ferguson-era writers Jonathan Morano, Bob Oschack, Ben Stout and Joe Strazzullo. Other continuing staff included Catherine Hoeven as supervising producer and Tim Mancinelli as director. New shows were aired from January 5, 2015 until March 6, 2015 with repeats of guest hosted programs being run during the final two weeks prior to Corden's premiere.

The show was filmed using the old Craig Ferguson set at Studio 56 in CBS Television City in Los Angeles. The fireplace component was removed, as were the props that sat on Ferguson's desk, and the door previously used by Secretariat, the pantomime horse, remained closed, and the set used a black vinyl surface floor. Geoff Peterson, Ferguson's animatronic sidekick, did not continue on the program but his podium remained and was used during several weeks by sidekicks, for instance when either CBS Daytime game show host served as guest host, the podium was used by that game show's respective announcer, who served as his sidekick. A different, shorter, and instrumental theme song was used for the program played over a montage of time lapse images of Los Angeles. For the week of programs recorded in New York City, the show was broadcast from Studio 57 at the CBS Broadcast Center, which is the home of CBS This Morning, without a studio audience. The opening credit sequence consisted of a montage of stock time-lapse videography of New York City scenes while the theme music remained the same. The show used the same logo as Ferguson's show except with Ferguson's name removed.

The Talk aired a nighttime edition in the Late Late Show timeslot for one week which was taped in its home studio and another week of Late Late Shows was filmed in New York City instead of Los Angeles. As the Late Late Show set in Studio 56 set in CBS Television City, Los Angeles, was not being used for these two weeks the producers were able to pre-record two weeks of programs for broadcast in late February and early March which, in turn, gave CBS more time to strike the old set from Studio 56 and erect a new one for The Late Late Show with James Corden, also giving Corden and his team additional time to rehearse and do advance taping of segments on their new set prior to Corden's March 23 premiere.

This was not the first time a major late-night American talk show has experienced an interregnum period. In 1962, after Jack Paar's departure and prior to Johnny Carson beginning his 30-year tenure as host, The Tonight Show underwent a period of approximately six months during which a number of temporary guest hosts were used. From September to December 2004, the Late Late Show had a series of guest hosts in a series of on-air auditions to replace departed host Craig Kilborn. The longest interregnum was from 1996 until 2000 for NBC's Later, which had a 'guest host of the week' format between Greg Kinnear and Cynthia Garrett as the timeslot was a low priority for NBC to fill with a permanent host.

== Hosts ==
Host	Appearances	Sidekick
Drew Carey	10	George Gray
Wayne Brady	5	Jonathan Mangum
Kunal Nayyar	3	none
Tom Lennon	3	Figs Housecat
John Mayer	3	Ed Sheeran
Jim Gaffigan	3	Jeannie Gaffigan
Judd Apatow	2	none
Regis Philbin	2	none
Whitney Cummings	2	Bridget Everett
Sean Hayes	2	none
Billy Gardell	2	none
Adam Pally	1	Ben Schwartz
Lauren Graham	1	none
Will Arnett	1	none

== 2015 ==
=== January ===
No.	Original release date	Guest(s)	Musical/entertainment guest(s)
1	January 5, 2015	Eric Idle, Tessa Thompson	Lachlan Patterson
Host: Drew Carey; Sidekick: George Gray
2	January 6, 2015	Alyssa Milano, Joel Stein	Ryan Hamilton
Host: Drew Carey; Sidekick: George Gray
3	January 7, 2015	Mark Harmon, Jessica St. Clair. David Arquette was originally scheduled as a guest but cancelled.	Esther Povitsky
Host: Drew Carey; Sidekick: George Gray
4	January 8, 2015	Ethan Hawke, Monica Potter	Pennybirdrabbit
Host: Drew Carey; Sidekick: George Gray
5	January 9, 2015	Larry King. Sharon Osbourne was originally scheduled as a guest but cancelled.	Penn & Teller
Host: Drew Carey; Sidekick: George Gray
6	January 12, 2015	Ozzy Osbourne, Retta	Linda Perry & Holy Coyote
After-dark edition of The Talk in The Late Late Show timeslot with Julie Chen, Sara Gilbert, Sharon Osbourne, Sheryl Underwood & Aisha Tyler.
7	January 13, 2015	Seth Green, Melissa Fumero	Linda Perry & Holy Coyote
After-dark edition of The Talk in The Late Late Show timeslot with Julie Chen, Sara Gilbert, Sharon Osbourne, Sheryl Underwood & Aisha Tyler.
8	January 14, 2015	Nick Cannon	Linda Perry & Holy Coyote
After-dark edition of The Talk in The Late Late Show timeslot with Julie Chen, Sara Gilbert, Sharon Osbourne, Sheryl Underwood & Aisha Tyler.
9	January 15, 2015	Kristin Chenoweth	Linda Perry & Holy Coyote
After-dark edition of The Talk in The Late Late Show timeslot with Julie Chen, Sara Gilbert, Sharon Osbourne, Sheryl Underwood & Aisha Tyler.
10	January 16, 2015	George Lopez	Linda Perry & Holy Coyote
After-dark edition of The Talk in The Late Late Show timeslot with Julie Chen, Sara Gilbert, Sharon Osbourne, Sheryl Underwood & Aisha Tyler.
11	January 19, 2015	Michael Ian Black, Ashley Williams	Justin Willman
Host: Jim Gaffigan; Co-host: Jeannie Gaffigan; Featuring: Marre, Katie, Jack, Michael, & Patrick Gaffigan; Cameo: Eddie Pepitone
12	January 20, 2015	Sarah Silverman, Kumail Nanjiani	Wolfgang Puck
Host: Jim Gaffigan; Co-host: Jeannie Gaffigan; Featuring: Marre, Katie, Jack, Michael, & Patrick Gaffigan; Cameo: Bob Saget
13	January 21, 2015	Adam Goldberg, Dave Koechner, Tig Notaro	N/A
Host: Jim Gaffigan; Co-host: Jeannie Gaffigan; Featuring: Marre, Katie, Jack, Michael, & Patrick Gaffigan; Cameo: Kiefer Sutherland
14	January 22, 2015	Adam Sandler, Lena Dunham (also co-host), Maria Bamford	N/A
Host: Judd Apatow
15	January 23, 2015	Jeff Goldblum, Garry Shandling	Ryan Adams
Host: Judd Apatow; Cameos: Lena Dunham, Bill Hader, Amy Schumer, James Corden
16	January 26, 2015	Martin Short, Susan Sarandon, Alan Alda	Annie Lennox
Host: Regis Philbin; Show is taped in New York City this week on the CBS This Morning set, without a studio audience.
17	January 27, 2015	David Letterman and Paul Shaffer, Donald Trump, Charlie Rose, Tracy Wolfson	Counting Crows
Host: Regis Philbin; Show is taped in New York City this week on the CBS This Morning set, without a studio audience. Tony Danza and Martha Stewart were originally scheduled instead of Trump and Rose.
18	January 28, 2015	Kat Dennings and Beth Behrs, Ana Gasteyer, Rhea Seehorn	Bridget Everett (with Marc Shaiman)
Host: Whitney Cummings, Sidekick: Bridget Everett; Cameo: Chris D'Elia; Show is taped in New York City this week on the CBS This Morning set, without a studio audience. Interview with Dennings and Behrs was pretaped on 2 Broke Girls set; Cummings is a creator/executive producer of that series.
19	January 29, 2015	Alan Cumming, Alison Brie, Joanne Froggatt	OK Go
Host: Whitney Cummings, Sidekick: Bridget Everett; Show is taped in New York City this week on the CBS This Morning set, without a studio audience. Interview with Brie pre-recorded in California.
20	January 30, 2015	Martellus Bennett, Beth Stern, Eric André	Death Cab For Cutie
Host: Adam Pally; Sidekick: Ben Schwartz; Show is taped in New York City this week on the CBS This Morning set, without a studio audience. Bennett was interviewed via satellite from Glendale, Arizona Super Bowl XLIX festitives.

=== February ===
No.	Original release date	Guest(s)	Musical/entertainment guest(s)
21	February 2, 2015	Marion Cotillard, Dame Edna Everage	Comic: Darrin Rose
Host: Sean Hayes. Jon Ryan was originally scheduled as a guest but cancelled.
22	February 3, 2015	Allison Janney, Jim Rash, Bob Harper	N/A
Host: Sean Hayes
23	February 4, 2015	Andy Cohen, Alison Becker	John Legend (with John Mayer)
Host: John Mayer; Cameo: Super Bowl XLIX halftime show sharks with Brian Huskey in character as Carl
24	February 5, 2015	Bob Saget, Mary Lynn Rajskub, Bob Weir	Bob Weir (with John Mayer)
Host: John Mayer
25	February 6, 2015	Ed Sheeran, Stephen Merchant, Jillian Bell	Ed Sheeran (with John Mayer)
Host: John Mayer; Cameo: Tattoo artists Marv and Freddie from Shamrock Social Club
26	February 9, 2015	Sara Rue, Ross Mathews	Robert Glasper
Host: Wayne Brady; Sidekick: Jonathan Mangum
27	February 10, 2015	Aisha Tyler	Magician: Justin Flom
Host: Wayne Brady; Sidekick: Jonathan Mangum
28	February 11, 2015	William Shatner, Cesar Millan	Freestyle Love Supreme
Host: Wayne Brady; Sidekick: Jonathan Mangum
29	February 12, 2015	John Leguizamo, Ryan Xie	Magicians: David Blatter & Leeman Parker
Host: Wayne Brady; Sidekick: Jonathan Mangum
30	February 13, 2015	Dick Cavett, Morena Baccarin, Derrick Pitts	N/A
Host: Wayne Brady; Sidekick: Jonathan Mangum
31	February 16, 2015	Weird Al Yankovic, Natasha Leggero, Maz Jobrani	Weird Al Yankovic
Host: Tom Lennon; Sidekick/Announcer/Drummer: Figs Housecat
32	February 17, 2015	Kal Penn, Lindsay Sloane	Comic: Troy Walker
Host: Tom Lennon; Sidekick/Announcer/Drummer: Figs Housecat
33	February 18, 2015	Matthew Perry, Nick Kroll	Comic: Ronny Chieng
Host: Tom Lennon; Sidekick/Announcer/Drummer: Figs Housecat
34	February 19, 2015	Ray Romano, Busy Philipps	Comic: Tom Papa
Host: Lauren Graham
35	February 20, 2015	Jimmy Kimmel, John Krasinski, David Cross	N/A
Host: Will Arnett; Cameo: Peter Lassally; Last taped show on the old Ferguson set and last pre-Corden show in order of taping. With this show, Peter Lassally retired after six decades of producing talk shows, and Worldwide Pants ended its involvement in the production of The Late Late Show.
36	February 23, 2015	Sharon Osbourne, Steve Byrne	L.A. Rocks
Host: Billy Gardell; Show was pre-recorded the last week of January for broadcast in February.
37	February 24, 2015	Jeff Probst, Yvette Nicole Brown	Comic: Greg Warren
Host: Billy Gardell; Show was pre-recorded the last week of January for broadcast in February.
38	February 25, 2015	Billy Bob Thornton, Sarah Hyland	Garfunkel and Oates
Host: Kunal Nayyar; Show was pre-recorded the last week of January for broadcast in February.
39	February 26, 2015	Bob Newhart, Cat Cora, Sim Bhullar	N/A
Host: Kunal Nayyar; Show was pre-recorded the last week of January for broadcast in February.
40	February 27, 2015	Simon Helberg, Britt Robertson, Owen Benjamin,	N/A
Host: Kunal Nayyar; Show was pre-recorded the last week of January for broadcast in February.

=== March ===
No.	Original release date	Guest(s)	Musical/entertainment guest(s)
41	March 2, 2015	Pauley Perrette, Josh Malina	Comic: Cathy Ladman
Host: Drew Carey; Sidekick: George Gray; Show was pre-recorded in January for broadcast in March.
42	March 3, 2015	Angela Kinsey	Comic: Paula Poundstone
Host: Drew Carey; Sidekick: George Gray; Show was pre-recorded in January for broadcast in March.
43	March 4, 2015	David Arquette, Steve Wozniak	Comic: Josh Robert Thompson
Host: Drew Carey; Sidekick: George Gray; Thompson voiced and operated Geoff Peterson on Ferguson's Late Late Show. Show was pre-recorded in January for broadcast in March.
44	March 5, 2015	Jane Lynch, Dan Riskin	Comic: Brendon Walsh
Host: Drew Carey; Sidekick: George Gray; Show was pre-recorded in January for broadcast in March.
45	March 6, 2015	Comic/Magician: Ed Alonzo	
Host: Drew Carey; Sidekick: George Gray; Show was pre-recorded in January for broadcast in March.
