= First of the Year =

First of the Year may refer to:

- January 1, which is New Year's Day in the Gregorian calendar
- New Year's Day#New Year's Day in other calendars
- "First of the Year (Equinox)", a song by Skrillex from the EP More Monsters and Sprites, 2011
