= The Late Show (franchise) =

American media franchise (1993–2026)

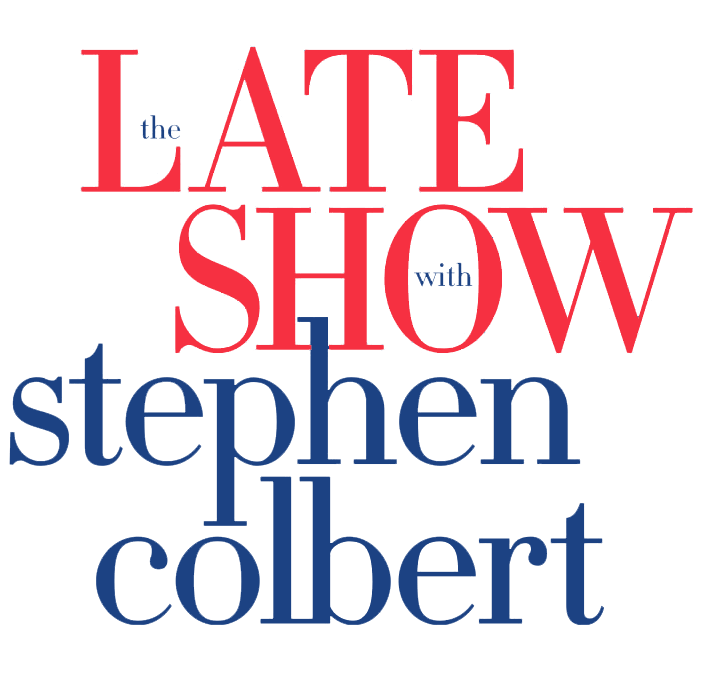
- Created by: David Letterman
- Presented by: David Letterman; Stephen Colbert
- Country of origin: United States
- No. of episodes: 4,214 (under Letterman); 1,801 (under Colbert)

Production
- Production locations: Ed Sullivan Theater; New York City
- Camera setup: Multi-camera
- Running time: 62 min. (with commercials)
- Production companies: Worldwide Pants Incorporated (1993–2015); Spartina Productions (2015–2026); CBS Productions (1993–2006); CBS Paramount Television (2006–2009); CBS Television Studios (2009–2020); CBS Studios (2020–2026)

Original release
- Network: CBS
- Release: August 30, 1993 – May 21, 2026

Related
- The Late Late Show; The CBS Late Movie; The Colbert Report; Late Night with David Letterman; The Pat Sajak Show; The David Letterman Show; The Merv Griffin Show

The Late Show is an American late-night talk show franchise that aired on CBS. It first aired on August 30, 1993, with host David Letterman, who previously hosted Late Night with David Letterman on NBC from 1982 to 1993. Letterman's iteration of the program ran until his retirement in May 2015. Comedian Stephen Colbert, best known for his roles on Comedy Central programs The Daily Show and The Colbert Report, assumed hosting duties that September. The show originated from the Ed Sullivan Theater in the Theater District of Manhattan, New York City, and aired live to tape in most American markets at 11:35 p.m. Eastern and Pacific, 10:35 in the Central and Mountain time zones.

CBS announced in 2025 that it was canceling The Late Show franchise, with the series finale airing on May 21, 2026, at the conclusion of Colbert's eleventh season.

== History ==
=== Prior to the Late Show ===
CBS had previously attempted late-night talk shows with The Merv Griffin Show (1969–1972) and The Pat Sajak Show (1989–1990) but neither were able to compete with NBC's The Tonight Show Starring Johnny Carson and were cancelled; Griffin's for editorial disputes with the network (he would go on to continue the show in syndication for 14 more years), and Sajak's for low ratings. For most of the 20 years preceding Late Show, CBS's late-night fare consisted of movies, re-runs, imported Canadian dramas and specialty programming packaged under the titles CBS Late Night and Crimetime After Primetime and broadcast to middling ratings, competing against The Tonight Show and, in its last years, the upstart success of a syndicated series, The Arsenio Hall Show, which began airing in January 1989. Before Letterman's arrival, CBS' New York flagship, WCBS-TV, specifically used the Late Show name for its late-night movie programming.

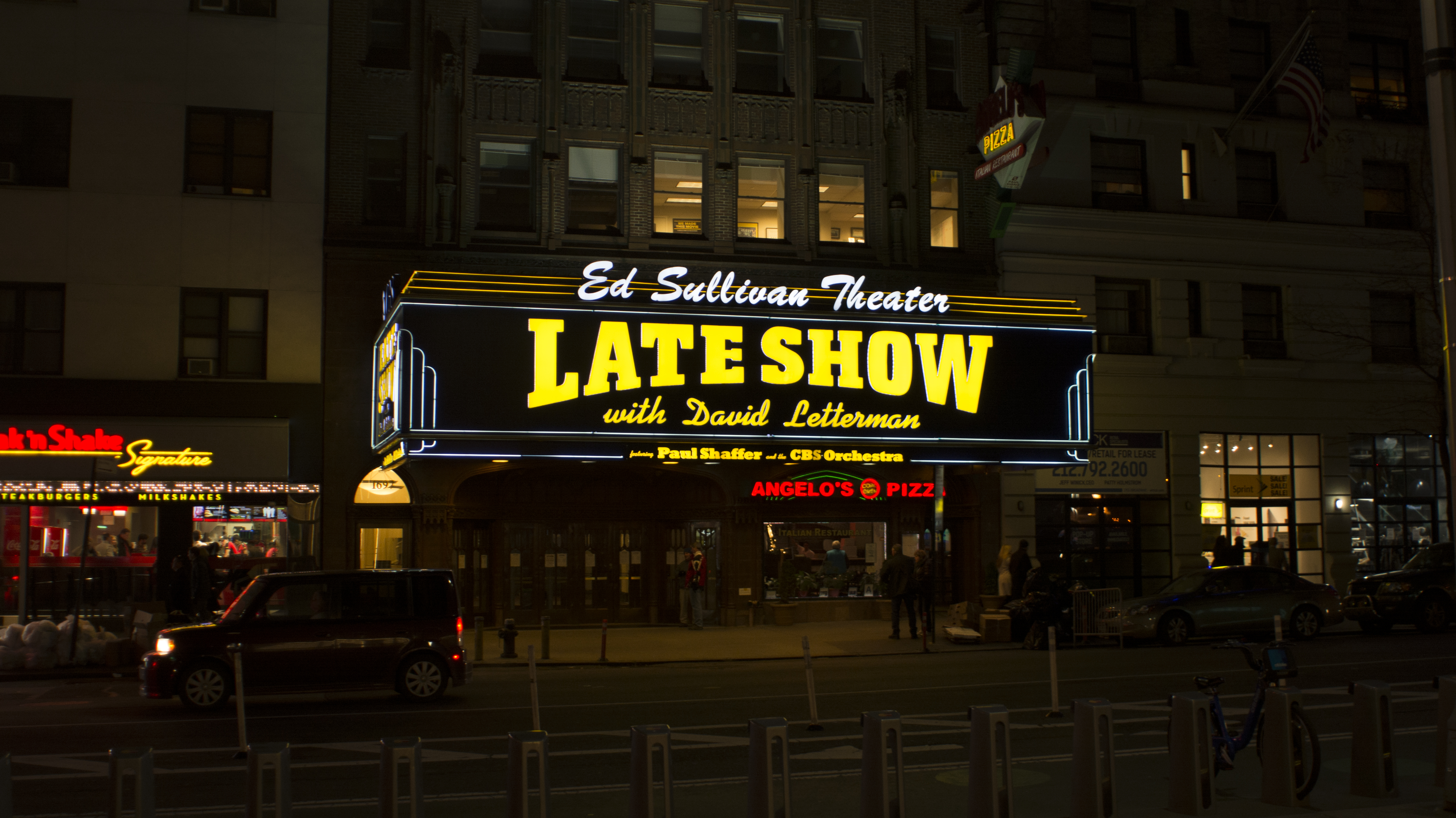
The Late Show Ed Sullivan Theater featuring Letterman marquee, which was removed on May 28, 2015

=== David Letterman (August 30, 1993 – May 20, 2015) ===
When David Letterman became available after being passed over by NBC for The Tonight Show, CBS was eager to lure him and offered him a three-year, $14 million per year contract, doubling his Late Night salary. According to their agreement, the show would spend a month in Hollywood at least once a year.

CBS purchased the Ed Sullivan Theater for four million dollars, spending "several million more" for renovation. The renovation was supervised by architect James Polshek. CBS' total cost for acquiring the show—including renovations, negotiation right paid to NBC, signing Letterman, announcer Bill Wendell, band leader Paul Shaffer, and the rest of the band—was over $140 million.

When Letterman moved to CBS and began the Late Show, several of Late Night's long-running comedy bits made the move with him. Letterman renamed a few of his regular bits to avoid legal problems over trademark infringement (NBC cited that what he did on Late Night was "intellectual property" of the network, a contention he disputed). "Viewer Mail" on NBC became the "CBS Mailbag", and Larry "Bud" Melman began to use his real name, Calvert DeForest. Shaffer's "World's Most Dangerous Band" became "The CBS Orchestra", a jab at NBC regarding the show's new home, and a play on the NBC Orchestra of the long running The Tonight Show. Letterman's signature bit, the Top Ten List, was perfunctorily renamed the "Late Show Top Ten List" (over time it reverted to its original name).

In ratings, Letterman's Late Show topped Leno's Tonight Show for its first two years. Leno pulled ahead on July 10, 1995, starting with a Hugh Grant interview, after Grant's much-publicized arrest for picking up an LA prostitute. Leno also benefited from the lead-in provided by NBC's popular Must See TV prime time programs of the mid-to-late 1990s. Likewise the CBS network was hurt by affiliation switches in late 1994 relating to Fox picking up CBS's National Football League rights (although CBS would reacquire those rights in 1998), stunting the Late Show just as it was beginning to gain traction. Despite CBS rising back to first place in prime time in the 2000s, Letterman never fully recovered from the damage, and he remained behind Leno and successor Jimmy Fallon for the rest of his tenure, only briefly rising back to first place during Conan O'Brien's run as host of The Tonight Show.

Announcer Bill Wendell left in 1995, with Alan Kalter taking his place for the remainder of Letterman's run as host.

On April 3, 2014, Letterman announced his retirement. His last telecast aired on May 20, 2015.

=== CBS Summer Showcase – transition (May 21 – September 7, 2015) ===
Instead of airing a transitional version of Late Show with guest hosts (as happened with The Late Late Show from January to March 2015 between the end of Craig Ferguson's show and the premiere of James Corden's) or reruns from Letterman's time as host (as NBC did during its interregnums on The Tonight Show and Late Night), CBS placed the Late Show on hiatus and instead aired reruns of scripted dramas in the 11:35 pm time slot over the summer with the branding CBS Summer Showcase. The network dismissed concerns that this may hurt the ratings of The Late Late Show with James Corden.

The plan was similar to CBS's pre-Letterman use of the slot for Crimetime After Primetime when police procedurals and mysteries aired in the slot in the early-1990s, and the late 1980s CBS Late Night which featured a mixture of scripted programming. CBS inaugurated the summer format with reruns of the final season of The Mentalist, a cancelled prime time police procedural, airing nightly from May 21 until June 5, 2015. Hawaii Five-0 (June 8–12, July 27–31), CSI: Cyber (June 15–19, August 17–21), Elementary (June 22–26), Blue Bloods (June 29–July 5), The Good Wife (July 6–10, August 24–28), NCIS: Los Angeles (July 13–17), NCIS (July 20–24; September 7) Scorpion (August 3–7), NCIS: New Orleans (August 10–14) and Madam Secretary (August 31 – September 4) also aired during the summer in the 11:35 pm time slot between the Letterman and Colbert transition.

The Late Late Show poked fun at the initial choice for its summer lead-in during several June episodes with a cold open sketch titled "Talking Mentalist", a parody of Talking Dead in which Corden, his bandleader Reggie Watts, and one of the show's scheduled guests discussed the episode that had just ended. Colbert would follow suit with a running gag on his first Late Show episode, showing CBS Corporation CEO Leslie Moonves with a giant switch which he could use to switch the network back to reruns of The Mentalist if he was dissatisfied with Colbert's performance (which he did, briefly, twice during the show).

=== Stephen Colbert (September 8, 2015 – May 21, 2026) ===
Stephen Colbert succeeded Letterman as host on September 8, 2015, having been signed to a five-year contract. In contrast with Colbert's previous program, The Colbert Report, in which he played a fictional character also named Stephen Colbert, Colbert hosts the show as himself. Colbert's version retains the Late Show name under license from Letterman's Worldwide Pants, which holds the registered trademark.

Several areas sought to acquire the Late Show, among them New York City, Los Angeles, and Connecticut. A report in the Daily News indicated that CBS Corporation had paid over $40,000 in campaign contributions to incumbent Governor Andrew Cuomo in an effort to lobby the governor for certain tax breaks to keep the show in New York City. A deal to keep the show at the Ed Sullivan Theater, which includes $16,000,000 in state tax incentives over a five-year period, was made official on July 23, 2014. Jon Batiste was the initial bandleader on Colbert's iteration of the program.

On July 17, 2025, CBS announced that it would be ending The Late Show with Stephen Colbert at the conclusion of its eleventh season, retiring The Late Show franchise altogether, in May 2026 after 33 years, and would sell its timeslot back to the affiliates. While CBS called the decision "financial", others believe it done in part to help obtain U.S. government approval for the Skydance/Paramount merger. Unnamed sources at CBS claim The Late Show was losing $40 million per year with a staff of 200 and Colbert making $20 million per year. In an interview with CNBC, FCC Chair Brendan Carr said that Paramount subsidiary CBS cancelling its The Late Show franchise helped the company comply with regulations. Two weeks earlier, Paramount Global had also settled a lawsuit with Donald Trump alleging deceptive editing of a 60 Minutes broadcast featuring then-Democratic presidential nominee Kamala Harris, despite the widespread belief that the company would prevail in court. The series finale aired on May 21, 2026. The show was replaced, beginning May 22, 2026, with Comics Unleashed in a time buy arrangement with the Allen Media Group. A network spokesperson said of the move: “With this ‘time buy’ model, we have shifted an hour that was losing roughly $40 million annually to $15 million in profit — a $55 million swing.”

== Hosting history ==
Host	Start date	End date	Duration	Episodes
David Letterman	August 30, 1993	May 20, 2015	21 years, 273 days	4,214
Stephen Colbert	September 8, 2015	May 21, 2026	10 years, 255 days	1,801
