= More Monsters and Sprites =

EP / remix album by Skrillex
- Released: June 7, 2011
- Recorded: October 2010 – February 2011
- Genre: Dubstep
- Length: 33:16
- Label: Big Beat, Atlantic
- Producer: Dirtyphonics; Kaskade; The Juggernaut; Phonat; Skrillex

Skrillex chronology
Scary Monsters and Nice Sprites (2010)	More Monsters and Sprites (2011)	Bangarang (2011)

Singles from More Monsters and Sprites
- 1. "First of the Year (Equinox)" Released: June 7, 2011; 2. "Ruffneck (FULL Flex)" Released: June 27, 2011

Professional ratings
Review scores
Source	Rating
AllMusic	3.5/5 stars
Sputnikmusic	2.5/5
Tom Hull	B+

More Monsters and Sprites is the third EP and first remix album by American electronic music producer Skrillex. It was released exclusively on Beatport on June 7, 2011, through Big Beat Records and mau5trap Recordings, while being released on other online retailers on June 21, 2011. It is a follow-up to his previous EP, Scary Monsters and Nice Sprites, containing four additional remixes of the title track done by Dirtyphonics, Phonat, The Juggernauts and Kaskade, as well as three original tracks. The iTunes version also includes a music video of "Rock n' Roll (Will Take You to the Mountain)". Musically, More Monsters and Sprites uses prominent elements of dubstep, while also featuring technical breakdowns and influences of reggae within the first track.

The EP reached number 124 on the Billboard 200, as well as the top five on the Billboard Heatseekers and Dance/Electronica Albums chart. It also reached number 60 on the ARIA Charts in Australia. Its lead single, "First of the Year (Equinox)", has since become the EP's most commercially successful single, peaking within the charts of the United States, Australia, Canada, Norway and Sweden. A music video for the song was directed by Tony Truand and was nominated at the 54th Grammy Awards for Best Short Form Music Video. The second single, "Ruffneck (Full Flex)", reached number 89 on the UK Singles Chart in the United Kingdom. A Christmas-themed music video directed by Tony Truand premiered for the song on December 23, 2011.

The project was originally intended to be an LP, but due to Skrillex's Milan, Italy hotel room being robbed not long before completion, it was made an EP.

A vinyl version of this album was released on November 23, 2012, with a very different track listing, forgoing most of the remix tracks for the 3 unique tracks from the album, followed by the 2010 single "WEEKENDS!!!" and a remix by Zedd.

== Track listing ==
All tracks are written by Skrillex.

No.	Title	Producer(s)	Length
1.	"First of the Year (Equinox)"	Skrillex	4:22
2.	"Ruffneck (Flex)"	Skrillex	4:43
3.	"Ruffneck (Full Flex)"	Skrillex	3:46
4.	"Scary Monsters and Nice Sprites" (Dirtyphonics Remix)	Skrillex; Dirtyphonics	4:51
5.	"Scary Monsters and Nice Sprites" (Phonat Remix)	Skrillex; Phonat	3:40
6.	"Scary Monsters and Nice Sprites" (The Juggernaut Remix)	Skrillex; The Juggernaut	3:54
7.	"Scary Monsters and Nice Sprites" (Kaskade Remix)	Skrillex; Kaskade	8:04
Total length:			33:16

Vinyl
No.	Title	Writer(s)	Producer(s)	Length
1.	"First of the Year (Equinox)"	Sonny Moore	Skrillex	4:22
2.	"Ruffneck (Flex)"	Moore	Skrillex	4:43
3.	"Ruffneck (Full Flex)"	Moore	Skrillex	3:46
4.	"Weekends" (featuring Sirah)	Moore; Sara Mitchell	Skrillex	4:51
5.	"Weekends" (featuring Sirah) (Zedd Remix)	Moore; Mitchell	Skrillex; Zedd	3:40

iTunes Bonus
No.	Title	Producer(s)	Length
8.	"Rock 'N' Roll (Will Take You to the Mountain)" (Music Video)	One & Only Productions, Jason Ano (director)	4:35

Special Mortal Kombat 9 Edition
No.	Title	Writer(s)	Producer(s)	Length
8.	"Reptile's Theme"	Moore	Skrillex	3:57
9.	"Cinema" (Skrillex Remix) (performed by Benny Benassi featuring Gary Go)	Alessandro Benassi; Gary Baker; Marco Benassi	Benny Benassi; Alle Benassi; Skrillex	5:04

== Charts ==
Chart (2011)	Peak position
Australian Albums (ARIA)	60
US Billboard 200	124
US Dance/Electronic Albums (Billboard)	5

== Certifications ==
Region	Certification	Certified units/sales
Australia (ARIA)	Platinum	70,000^{‡}
^{‡} Sales+streaming figures based on certification alone.

== Release history ==
Region	Date	Format	Label	Catalogue
United States	June 7, 2011	Digital download	Big Beat, Atlantic	075679968098
Australia	June 7, 2011	Digital download	Neon	NEON00055
United States	June 27, 2011	Digital download	Big Beat, Atlantic	
United States	November 23, 2012	12"	Big Beat	075678762086
