= Bangarang (EP) =

EP by Skrillex
- Released: December 23, 2011
- Recorded: June–August 2011
- Genres: Dubstep; electro; brostep; EDM
- Length: 30:08
- Labels: Owsla; Big Beat; Atlantic
- Producers: Skrillex; 12th Planet; Wolfgang Gartner; Kill the Noise; Varien

Skrillex chronology
More Monsters and Sprites (2011)	Bangarang (2011)	Leaving (2013)

Singles from Bangarang
- 1. "Breakn' a Sweat" Released: January 15, 2012; 2. "Bangarang" Released: February 16, 2012

Bangarang is the fourth EP by American electronic music producer Skrillex. It was released on December 23, 2011, via Beatport while being released on other digital retailers on December 27, 2011. It was released on January 24, 2012, as a physical CD. It was announced via Skrillex's Twitter page on December 12, 2011, that the album was completed, while the release date was also announced on December 21. The record is mostly a collection of songs that have been previously performed during The Mothership Tour (with the exception of "Right on Time"). It features collaborations with the Doors, Sirah, Wolfgang Gartner, 12th Planet, Kill the Noise and Ellie Goulding. Musically, Bangarang has multiple influences of electro, dubstep and techno, while also incorporating elements of eurodance, drum and bass, rap rock, experimental rock and ska. It features syncopated rhythmic build-ups, technical breakdowns and "chopped-up" vocal hooks, as well as multiple vocal samples. An orchestral song was also featured as a bonus track on the iTunes edition.

Bangarang received mixed reviews from music critics, but was a commercial success upon release, charting within Australia, Canada, New Zealand, Norway, Switzerland, the United Kingdom and the United States. Its lead single, "Bangarang", charted in multiple countries worldwide and reached the top 10 in Australia and Belgium. Due to strong digital sales following the album's release, "Kyoto" and "Breakn' a Sweat" charted in multiple countries as well. "Breakn' a Sweat" was featured in the 2012 documentary film Re:Generation. Music videos have been released for "Breakn' a Sweat", "Summit" and "Bangarang". The Bangarang had sold 595,000 copies in the United States by March 2014, and on July 11, 2016, it was certified gold by the Recording Industry Association of America (RIAA).

== Composition ==
Musically, while Bangarang prominently uses elements of electro house, dubstep and progressive house, it is more diverse than his previous material, including multiple influences of trance, drum and bass, rap rock, experimental rock and ska. It uses syncopated rhythmic build-ups, technical breakdowns, "chopped-up" vocal hooks and vocal samples throughout its composition.

The first track, "Right In", has multiple influences of dubstep and electro house and has been described as "one long adrenaline rush of stabbing keyboard chords, sawed-off vocal samples and Skrillex's trademark: squirming, squalling synth lines". It has also been compared to the opener on his previous remix EP More Monsters and Sprites, "First of the Year (Equinox)". The title track, "Bangarang", also uses heavy influences of Moombahcore and has been compared to the previous track. It uses "chopped-up vocal hooks" performed by American rapper Sirah, with the last line of the song saying "I'm eating Fun Dip right now/Not givin' a fuck". It has been described as having a "concussive collection of blips and bursts that sounds like something Moby might hear in his head during a heart attack". Breakn' a Sweat was written for the 2012 documentary film Re:Generation. It has been described as combining "proggy guitar hooks, psychedelic organ chords, and Jim Morrison samples with a snarling, Prodigy-esque vocal and a filthy slab of dub bass". It has been highlighted as the most unusual track on the release by several music critics. "The Devil's Den" features guest contributions from Wolfgang Gartner and has been described as "Daft Punk-go-Dirty Vegas". It uses elements of trance, techno, ska and rave.

"Right on Time" has been described as "a percussive, hard house collaboration with 12th Planet and Kill the Noise which eventually builds into a feverish slice of happy hardcore", and although it has been complimented for its uniqueness in comparison with the rest of the record, its use of repetition has been criticized. "Kyoto" is a "rap-metal fusion" that is also the second track to feature Sirah. It has been compared to rap rock artists such as Linkin Park and Travis Barker. "Summit" is the final track (with the exception of the iTunes edition) and features English singer-songwriter Ellie Goulding. It is an electronic song that has elements of chillstep and uses Skrillex's "chopped up", Auto-Tune vocals. Goulding's vocals have been described as "ethereal" and "delicate". The iTunes edition of Bangarang includes an "Orchestral Suite" performed by Varien and arranged by Van Dyke Parks.

== Critical reception ==
Professional ratings
Aggregate scores
Source	Rating
Metacritic	60/100
Review scores
Source	Rating
AllMusic	2.5/5 stars
Alternative Press	3/5 stars
The A.V. Club	C
Los Angeles Times	2.5/4 stars
MSN Music (Expert Witness)	A−
NME	4/10
Now	3/5
Rolling Stone	3.5/5 stars
Spin	7/10
Toronto Star	2.5/4 stars

According to the review aggregator Metacritic, Bangarang received "mixed or average reviews" based on a weighted average score of 60 out of 100 from 10 critic scores. Dan LeRoy of Alternative Press felt that the album's "go-for-the-throat" songs and "uncomplicated, catchy fun" do not reveal "much about Skrillex's long-term prospects." Evan Rytlewski of The A.V. Club said that, although Skrillex is a "more skillful producer than his detractors give him credit for", he still resorts to "gimmicks" in order to reach his audience. Gavin Haynes of NME found his music artificial, albeit with occasionally "good results". AllMusic's Jon O'Brien observed a "lack of progression" from Skrillex and called the release "disappointingly formulaic". He also felt that even the more unconventional songs are "more headache-inducing than thrilling." Deviant of Sputnikmusic panned its songs as "the same big-boy slab of molten bass drops and screeching whistles", but without a "spark" or "sense of attitude", and accused Skrillex of producing "the same half-assed bass trends".

In a positive review for MSN Music, Robert Christgau called Bangarang an "electronical vista" and said it is "a pop record because its shamelessly hedonistic barrage of proven dancefloor tricks will obviously be more fun at home than in a club." August Brown of the Los Angeles Times felt that, although Skrillex continues his "singular, manic sound", the "quick" tracks that defined his previous work are "more skillful and sonically intriguing". Ben Rayner of the Toronto Star found it "far smarter than Skrillex's reputation for doling out cheap, bludgeoning bass-bin thrills would let on", and wrote that it displays "a remarkable gift for bending innumerable breeds of club music to his will". Garrett Kamps of Spin called it "spracked out and ridiculous and fun and sometimes disposable". Rolling Stone magazine's Jon Dolan called Skrillex "a magician" whose "trick is turning the elusively thwumping U.K. dance music called dubstep into high-fiving dance-floor heavy metal."

Rolling Stone later named Bangarang the fourteenth greatest EDM album of all time. Christgau named it the sixth best album of 2012 in his list for The Barnes & Noble Review. Bangarang won the Best Dance/Electronica Album award at the 55th Grammy Awards, as well as the Best Dance Recording award for the title track.

== Track listing ==
Bangarang track listing
No.	Title	Writer(s)	Producer(s)	Length
1.	"Right In"	Sonny Moore	Skrillex	3:00
2.	"Bangarang" (featuring Sirah)	Moore; Sara Mitchell	Skrillex	3:35
3.	"Breakn' a Sweat" (with the Doors)	Moore; Jim Morrison; Ray Manzarek; John Densmore; Robby Krieger	Skrillex	5:02
4.	"The Devil's Den" (with Wolfgang Gartner)	Moore; Joseph Thomas Youngman	Skrillex; Wolfgang Gartner	4:53
5.	"Right on Time" (with 12th Planet and Kill the Noise)	Moore; John Dadzie; Jacob Stanczak	Skrillex; 12th Planet; Kill the Noise	4:05
6.	"Kyoto" (featuring Sirah)	Moore; Mitchell	Skrillex	3:21
7.	"Summit" (featuring Ellie Goulding)	Moore	Skrillex	6:14
Total length:				30:08

Digital edition bonus track
No.	Title	Writer(s)	Producer(s)	Length
8.	"Skrillex Orchestral Suite" (performed by Varien)	Moore; Nick Pittsinger	Varien	6:55

== Charts ==
=== Weekly charts ===
Weekly chart performance for Bangarang
Chart (2012)	Peak position
Australian Albums (ARIA)	4
Australian Dance Albums (ARIA)	1
Belgian Albums (Ultratop Flanders)	89
Canadian Albums (Billboard)	4
Mexican Albums (Top 100 Mexico)	21
New Zealand Albums (RMNZ)	3
Norwegian Albums (VG-lista)	25
Polish Albums (ZPAV)	33
Scottish Albums (Official Charts)	35
Swiss Albums (Schweizer Hitparade)	47
UK Albums (Official Charts)	31
UK Dance Albums (Official Charts)	1
US Billboard 200	14
US Top Dance Albums (Billboard)	1

=== Year-end charts ===
Year-end chart performance for Bangarang
Chart (2012)	Position
Australian Albums (ARIA)	18
Australian Dance Albums (ARIA)	1
Canadian Albums (Billboard)	21
Mexican Albums (Top 100 Mexico)	73
New Zealand Albums (RMNZ)	16
UK Albums (OCC)	108
US Billboard 200	63
US Top Dance/Electronic Albums (Billboard)	3

== Certifications ==
Certifications for Bangarang
Region	Certification	Certified units/sales
Australia (ARIA)	Platinum	70,000^{^}
Austria (IFPI Austria)	Platinum	20,000^{*}
Canada (Music Canada)	Platinum	80,000^{^}
Mexico (AMPROFON)	Platinum	60,000^{^}
New Zealand (RMNZ)	2× Platinum	30,000^{‡}
Switzerland (IFPI Switzerland)	Platinum	30,000^{^}
United Kingdom (BPI)	Gold	100,000^{^}
United States (RIAA)	Platinum	1,000,000^{‡}
^{*} Sales figures based on certification alone.^{^} Shipments figures based on certification alone.^{‡} Sales+streaming figures based on certification alone.
