= Ruffneck (Full Flex) =

2011 single by Skrillex

Single by Skrillex

from the EP More Monsters and Sprites
- Released: June 27, 2011
- Recorded: 2011
- Genre: Dubstep
- Length: 3:46
- Label: Big Beat
- Songwriter: Skrillex

Skrillex singles chronology
"First of the Year (Equinox)" (2011)	"Ruffneck (Full Flex)" (2011)	"Narcissistic Cannibal" (2011)

Music video
- "Ruffneck (Full Flex)" on YouTube

"Ruffneck (Full Flex)" was released as the second single from Skrillex's third EP, More Monsters and Sprites. It was an unofficial song of the London 2012 Summer Olympics. It is featured in the corresponding video game.

== Music video ==
Directed by Tony T. Datis, a music video made its premiere on Skrillex's YouTube channel on December 23, 2011. In the video, a department store Santa Claus who is addicted to drugs has a panic attack while talking to children. The security then chases Santa to a higher floor of the building where they begin to beat him up. After several seconds of being beaten by the security, Santa appears to gain strength and begins to defend himself. He eventually defeats the gang and runs to an outside balcony, where he kneels down and enjoys the falling snow. At the end of the video his nose begins to bleed.

== Critical reception ==
Data Transmission commented on the track by saying "'Ruffneck (Full Flex)' is a constant barrage of bass sounds, glitchy effects and hard synths. With numerous edits, richly characterful bass and the usual catchiness of [Skrillex's] other tracks, Full Flex sees the controversial producer in more familiar territory, packing enormous amounts of detail into every bar."

== Charts ==
Chart performance for "Ruffneck (Full Flex)"
Chart (2011)	Peak position
UK Dance (Official Charts)	20
UK Singles (OCC)	89
