= Bangarang =

2011 single by Skrillex featuring Sirah

Single by Skrillex featuring Sirah

from the EP Bangarang
- Released: December 24, 2011
- Recorded: 2011
- Genre: Dubstep; moombahcore; complextro
- Length: 3:35
- Label: Big Beat; Atlantic; Owsla
- Songwriter: Sonny Moore
- Producer: Skrillex

Skrillex singles chronology
"Breakn' a Sweat" (2012)	"Bangarang" (2012)	"Chaos Lives in Everything" (2012)

Music video
- "Bangarang" on YouTube

"Bangarang" is a song by American electronic music producer Skrillex. It was released as a single from his EP of the same name. It featured guest rap vocals from American hip hop recording artist Sirah. "Bangarang" intersperses Sirah's rap vocals throughout the song. The title comes from Jamaican Patois, where it means a noisy commotion, by way of the 1991 film Hook, where it is used as a battle cry.

"Bangarang" was one of Skrillex's most commercially successful singles. It was charted within the United States, United Kingdom, Australia, Austria, France, New Zealand, Norway and Sweden. A music video for the song premiered on February 16, 2012 via his official YouTube channel. "Bangarang" received airplay on some modern rock radio stations. The song won a Grammy Award for Best Dance Recording.

== Critical reception ==
Jon Dollan from Rolling Stone noted "the laser-blasting inanity of the track, which ends with someone bragging, 'I'm eating Fun Dip right now/Not givin' a fuck.' Not a bad credo for music that makes a disco sugar high feel downright pornographic". Garret Kamps from Spin gave the song a positive review, calling it a "massively enjoyable, massively concussive collection of blips and bursts that sounds like something Moby might hear in his head during a heart attack, so thoroughly and dyspeptically is dubstep's characteristic bass wobble distorted and pushed into the red. That remains [his] signature trick ..."

Rolling Stone named the song the 22nd-best song of 2012.

== Music video ==
A music video for the song premiered via YouTube on February 16, 2012. It depicts a group of three young boys robbing an ice cream truck in an elaborate heist. During the robbery, the ringleader of the boys amputates the truck driver's hand by slamming a door on his wrist. While the other boys celebrate, he throws his ice cream down in shame and disgust.

When the boys have grown to adulthood, they perform a similarly elaborate heist on a group of bank robbers who have stolen several briefcases of cash. They succeed in stealing the cash, and the gang's leader surprises the ice cream man by giving him one of the cases.

Drawing from the song's 'Peter Pan/Hook' theme, the video features references to Captain Hook in the ice cream truck driver's style of moustache, the tattoo of a crocodile on his right hand, and the replacement of that hand with a hook.

== Track listing ==
Promo CD / digital download
No.	Title	Length
1.	"Bangarang" (featuring Sirah)	3:35

== Commercial performance ==
The song has charted in multiple countries worldwide, including Australia, Austria, Belgium, Canada, Finland, France, Netherlands, Norway, New Zealand, Sweden, the United Kingdom and the United States. In Australia, the song became a commercial success, reaching the top five within the ARIA Charts whilst spending more than 20 weeks within the top 50. It has also been certified 4× Platinum by the Australian Recording Industry Association (ARIA).

In the United States, the song entered the Billboard Bubbling Under Hot 100 chart at number four due to strong digital downloads. However, on the issue date of March 3, 2012, the song debuted at number 95 on the Billboard Hot 100. It since reached a peak of number 72 and spent more than 20 weeks on the chart. It has sold over one million copies in the US as of January 2013. In the United Kingdom, the song reached a peak of number 24 and spent a total of 16 weeks inside the UK top 40.

== Charts ==
=== Weekly charts ===
Chart (2012)	Peak position
Australia (ARIA)	4
Australia Dance (ARIA)	1
Austria (Ö3 Austria Top 40)	25
Belgium (Ultratop 50 Flanders)	9
Belgium (Ultratip Bubbling Under Flanders)	2
Belgium Dance (Ultratop Flanders)	1
Belgium (Ultratip Bubbling Under Wallonia)	9
Belgium Dance Bubbling Under (Ultratop Wallonia)	2
Canada Hot 100 (Billboard)	26
Finland (Suomen virallinen lista)	12
France (SNEP)	63
Germany (GfK)	55
Honduras (Honduras Top 50)	10
Ireland (IRMA)	50
Netherlands (Single Top 100)	59
New Zealand (Recorded Music NZ)	14
Norway (VG-lista)	16
Romania (Romanian Top 100)	70
Sweden (Sverigetopplistan)	24
Switzerland (Schweizer Hitparade)	61
UK Dance (Official Charts)	3
UK Singles (Official Charts)	24
US Billboard Hot 100	72

=== Year-end charts ===
Chart (2012)	Position
Australia (ARIA)	21
Austria (Ö3 Austria Top 40)	74
Belgium (Ultratop Flanders)	34
Canada (Canadian Hot 100)	74
France (SNEP)	106
Sweden (Sverigetopplistan)	44
UK Singles (Official Charts Company)	73
US On-Demand Songs (Billboard)	33

Chart (2013)	Position
Australia Streaming (ARIA)	100
France (SNEP)	151
UK Singles (Official Charts Company)	199

== Certifications ==
Region	Certification	Certified units/sales
Australia (ARIA)	7× Platinum	490,000^{‡}
Belgium (BRMA)	Gold	15,000^{*}
Canada (Music Canada)	6× Platinum	480,000^{‡}
Germany (BVMI)	Gold	150,000^{‡}
Italy (FIMI)	Platinum	50,000^{‡}
Mexico (AMPROFON)	Platinum	60,000^{*}
New Zealand (RMNZ)	2× Platinum	30,000^{*}
Spain (Promusicae)	Gold	30,000^{‡}
Sweden (GLF)	Platinum	40,000^{‡}
United Kingdom (BPI)	Platinum	600,000^{‡}
United States (RIAA)	3× Platinum	3,000,000^{‡}
Streaming
Denmark (IFPI Danmark)	2× Platinum	3,600,000^{†}
^{*} Sales figures based on certification alone.^{‡} Sales+streaming figures based on certification alone.^{†} Streaming-only figures based on certification alone.
