= Breakn' a Sweat =

- Zedd remix cover

Single by Skrillex and the Doors

from the EP Bangarang
- Released: January 15, 2012
- Recorded: June – August 2011
- Genre: Dubstep; dance-pop
- Length: 5:02
- Label: Big Beat; Atlantic; Owsla
- Songwriters: Jim Morrison; Ray Manzarek; John Densmore; Robby Krieger; Skrillex
- Producer: Skrillex

Skrillex singles chronology
| "Narcissistic Cannibal" (2011) | "Breakn' a Sweat" (2012) | "Bangarang" (2012) |

The Doors singles chronology
| "Get Up and Dance" (1972) | "Breakn' a Sweat" (2012) |

Music video
- "Breakn' a Sweat" on YouTube

"Breakn' a Sweat" is a song by American electronic music producer Skrillex. It is the third track on his fourth EP, Bangarang. It features guest vocal and musical contributions from the surviving members of the American rock band the Doors. It was created for Re:Generation music project, a 2012 documentary film. It contains a vocal sample from a 1960s interview with Jim Morrison, while the remaining members of the Doors and Skrillex did the chants. A dubstep and dance-pop song, it received generally positive reviews from music critics, with some highlighting it as the standout track from the EP. The song charted at number 32 on the UK Singles Chart. Zedd included his remix on the deluxe edition of Clarity.

== Critical reception ==
"Breakn' a Sweat" received generally positive reviews from music critics, with some praising the collaboration and highlighting it as one of the standout tracks from the EP. However, others criticized its incorporation of a sample of a Jim Morrison interview from 1969 in which he said, "I can envision one person with a lot of machines – tapes, electronic set ups – singing and speaking, and using machines." Jon O'Brien of AllMusic gave the song a positive review, saying "There are a few more encouraging signs, such as the Doors-featuring "Breakn' a Sweat," which combines proggy guitar hooks, psychedelic organ chords, and Jim Morrison samples with a snarling, Prodigy-esque vocal and a filthy slab of dub bass to produce one of the year's most unexpectedly successful partnerships". He also indicated it as one of the AMG track picks. Rolling Stone's Jon Dolan also highlighted it as a recommendation on the EP. Kevin Vincenti from The Cavalier Daily also gave it a positive review, saying "The Doors join Skrillex on "Breakn' A Sweat", creating a marriage between the former's rock stylings and the latter's traditional techno. A fun song with plenty of vocal integration, "Breakn' a Sweat" doesn't blow the door off its hinges, but it will keep you dancing until the music stops." A writer from Toronto Stars said, "He's bright enough to use his Doors collaboration, "Breakn' a Sweat", as a mouthpiece for some meta-commentary about the nature of creating electronic music here. He's got skills and something to say." Chris Richards from The Washington Post said ""Breakn' a Sweat" is a more patient, less aggressive tune — but it might be because Skrillex was trying to mind his manners".

A writer for Spin said "The Hyundai-sponsored collaboration "Breakn' a Sweat" (for the documentary RE:GENERATION), which features the three surviving members of the Doors jamming over a Skrillex beat, and is literally the sound of generations colliding, awkwardly if sort of admirably, but still... It's supposed to be a reworking of Miles Davis' 1958 modal-jazz classic "Milestones." See if you can tell. (Hint: You can't.)". Dan LeRoy from Alternative Press gave the song a negative review, saying "If you want to complain, listen to "Breakn' A Sweat", a collaboration with what remains of the Doors that's less dubstep than ghastly misstep. (The faux-rap interjections force you to imagine MC Hammer having his way with "Light My Fire" back in the day.) And whoever authorized the soundbite from a vintage Jim Morrison interview in order to give this track his posthumous imprimatur ought to be worried about his vengeful ghost".

== Music video ==
A music video for the song directed by Tony Truand premiered on January 15, 2012, via VEVO. It contains live footage from the 2012 documentary film Re:Generation, including interview segments and live performances from Skrillex himself and the surviving members of the Doors. Ellie Goulding is the model for the video.

A second music video was released on Skrillex's official YouTube account on November 6, 2012, which was directed by Los Angeles director Radical Friend. The video was also featured in 3D on Nintendo Video on the Nintendo 3DS.

The video is about two gray-skinned people, presumably aliens from another dimension. This dimension appears to consist of a vast ocean, with small rocky islands, and a stormy red sky above. One alien appears to be a "female" alien, and the other appears to be a "male" alien. At the beginning of the video, the aliens are seen riding vehicles resembling jet skis across the ocean. The waters which the aliens are riding through are infested with mechanical sharks. One shark tries to leap out of the water to attack the aliens, but the male alien drops some type of grenade into the water, which the shark proceeds to devour, causing it to explode. When the shark explodes, several blue orbs are released from its body. After this, the aliens travel to a nearby island, where they collect the orbs after they have washed-up on shore. The female alien takes a bite out of one of the orbs, which reveals that the orb is filled with a brown, gooey substance (possibly meant to be chocolate). After the male alien also eats one of the orbs, the screen flashes between some images of the two aliens, which may represent an intercourse due to the fact that the female alien appears to be pregnant after this. When the female becomes pregnant, her belly becomes larger, and gives off a blueish glow. The aliens then seem to warp into a city on earth. The aliens are frightened by a helicopter flying overhead and attempt to run away from it. The female alien hijacks a car, and the two try to drive to safety. However, because the aliens have never driven a car, they are thrown back and forth in their seats. The female alien's abdominal region becomes transparent, revealing the baby alien inside her. The baby then appears to try to break out of its mother's stomach. At the end of the video, the screen goes black, and a shattering sound can be heard, followed by a feminine scream, likely meaning that the female alien gave birth to the baby.

== Usage in other media ==
The remixed version of the song by Zedd, was used in the reboot version of Need for Speed: Most Wanted. The track is also available in Zedd's deluxe version of Clarity album.

== Personnel ==
- Ray Manzarek – organ, keyboard bass, clavinet, vocals
- Robby Krieger – sitar guitar, electric lead and slide guitar, vocals
- John Densmore – percussion
- Skrillex - production, vocals
- Jim Morrison – spoken word (sampled)

== Chart performance ==
In the United Kingdom, the song debuted at number 91 on the UK Singles Chart due to strong digital download after the release of Bangarang. On the issue date of February 4, 2012, the song reached its peak of number 32.

Chart performance for "Breakn' a Sweat"
| Chart (2012) | Peak position |
|---|---|
| Canada Hot 100 (Billboard) | 80 |
| UK Singles (Official Charts) | 32 |
| UK Dance (Official Charts) | 6 |
