= Werewolves of Highland =

- Beavis and Butt-Head episode
- Butt-Head pointing at his neck when asking to be bitten.
- Episode no.: Season 8 Episode 1
- Directed by: Tony Kluck
- Written by: John Altschuler & Dave Krinsky
- Production code: 801
- Original air date: October 27, 2011

Episode chronology
← Previous "Beavis and Butt-Head Are Dead"	Next → "Crying"

"Werewolves of Highland" is the first episode of season 8 and 201st episode overall of the American animated television sitcom Beavis and Butt-Head, as well as the first episode of the series' revival after its initial cancellation in 1997. It aired alongside "Crying" on October 27, 2011, on MTV.

== Plot ==
Beavis and Butt-Head sneak into a movie theater, where they watch Twilight until a member of staff throws them out. They see that girls find the undead appealing. In class, Butt-Head asks David Van Driessen how to become undead during a lesson about romantic literature; he tells them that they must be bitten by one, which prompts the duo to leave class and look for a member of the undead. The duo find a crazy old homeless man named Henry, whom they mistake for a werewolf due to his long white hair and beard and large canine teeth. Beavis and Butt-Head ask him to bite them. Henry asks for a dollar, but Butt-Head gives him a piece of gum instead and he bites them several times. Henry is afflicted with several diseases and infects the duo with them. The duo are later seen at home, feeling poorly, their sickly-pale skin sporting a slew of bite marks and bruises, but they believe that they have become werewolves. While the boys are sitting in front of a shop in town, two gorgeous young women find them and have them taken to the hospital, even though the duo wrongly thought the beauties were going to take them on a date. At the hospital, it is discovered that Beavis and Butt-Head not only contracted hepatitis C, but hepatitis A, hepatitis B, gonorrhea, gangrene, MRSA and staph, surprising the doctor that they are still alive. As the nurse attempts to insert catheters while the duo are in intensive care, they start giggling at her touching their penises, despite being in deep comas, with Butt-Head uttering the word: "Deep..."

== Featured videos ==
- MGMT – "Kids"
- True Life – "I'm Addicted to Porn" on Jersey Shore
- Skrillex – "First of the Year (Equinox)"

== Production ==
This episode was created in response to the cultural phenomenon with vampires in movies and TV shows.

Mike Judge mentioned that he wanted the new episodes to be topical, starting with this episode, but there is no instance where the series acknowledges its 14-year gap. As of this episode, the hand-drawn animation process has also been updated and is in high-definition, but produced in the 4:3 aspect ratio, unlike most HD programs which are typically produced in 16:9. However, archive footage was used for featured video segments due to being broadcast in both 1080i and 480i.

During the first video segment Beavis utters the word "fire" a total of 7 times within 28 seconds, with Butt-Head saying it once as well, as a reference to the writers' ban on using the word "fire" which was set in place during the first run after the series was associated with a fire that was thought to have resulted in the death of a two-year-old in 1993.

== Reception ==
The episode was seen by 3,286,000 viewers in its initial airing.

IGN commented that the episode was one of the show's funniest episodes, stating "It would appear that Mike Judge's comedy senses have only sharpened over years" and also said "with a pilot this solid, and the promise of some great TV (and perhaps another movie) down the pipe, it's safe to assume Mike Judge's cult fame will continue for decades to come". HitFix states "Beavis and Butt-Head are who they've always been, for ill or (comedically) for good. I'm glad to have them back" when reviewing this episode and "Crying". Assignment X called the episode "reckless, silly and on target".
