= Pennybirdrabbit =

American singer and songwriter

- Born: Penny Barlow; October 14, 1990 (age 35)
- Origin: Los Angeles, California, U.S.
- Genres: EDM; indie pop
- Occupations: Singer; songwriter
- Instruments: Vocals; piano
- Years active: 2010–2015, 2020–present
- Labels: Owsla; Big Beat

Penny Barlow, known professionally as Pennybirdrabbit (stylized in lowercase) is an American singer and songwriter. After appearing on the Skrillex song "All I Ask of You" from his extended play (EP) Scary Monsters and Nice Sprites (2010), she released three EPs, including For Love (2014), before quitting music in 2015. She returned to music in 2020.

== Life and career ==
Penny Barlow was born in Oceanside, California and raised in Ridgecrest, California, where her mother's family lived. Her older brother is Cove Reber, the lead singer of the post-hardcore band Saosin. She started acting at age six after performing a solo from Babes in Toyland in Ridgecrest and getting signed by an agent, mostly doing stand-in. Also at age six, she began taking vocal lessons. After graduating from high school, she briefly attended the Oceanside College of Beauty after being enrolled by her parents, before dropping out and moving to Orem, Utah with her best friend, where she worked at Chili's for four years.

She later moved to Los Angeles to make music as Pennybirdrabbit, where she lived in her car. She and Skrillex met during the making of his debut extended play (EP), and Pennybirdrabbit first rose to prominence after being featured on the song "All I Ask of You" from his follow-up EP Scary Monsters and Nice Sprites. After performing the song with him in Las Vegas while he was touring, she was signed to Big Beat Records. In August 2013, she was featured on Kill the Noise's cover of the M Machine's song "Ghosts in the Machine" for their remix EP, Metropolis Remixed. She released three EPs by 2014, including her EP For Love, which was preceded by the single "Cheap Goodbyes" and released on February 14, 2014, through Owsla and Big Beat Records. In January 2015, she made her debut live television performance on The Late Late Show with guest host Drew Carey, performing an acoustic version of her song "Said It to Me".

While based in Los Angeles, Pennybirdrabbit planned to release a new EP until getting pregnant with a daughter. She was soon dropped from her record label and took a break from music until 2020, by which point she had moved to Mesa, Arizona. She independently released two singles in the summer of 2020: "Once Before" and "The Light in Me". As of 2020, Pennybirdrabbit has one daughter and one son and is married.

== Musical style ==
Pennybirdrabbit's music has been described as primarily EDM and indie pop, and she has also performed genres such as electropop and indie rock.
