= Waitin for You =

Song by Demi Lovato featuring Sirah

from the album Confident
- Studio: EastWest Studios (Los Angeles, CA); Rokstone Studios (London, England)
- Genre: R&B
- Length: 3:12
- Label: Hollywood; Island; Safehouse
- Songwriters: Demi Lovato; Julia Michaels; Jason Evigan; Steve Mac; Sara Mitchell
- Producers: Jason Evigan; Steve Mac; Mitch Allan

Music video
- "Waitin for You" on YouTube

"Waitin for You" is a song recorded by American singer Demi Lovato featuring rapper Sirah. The duo along with Julia Michaels, Jason Evigan and Steve Mac composed the song for Lovato's fifth studio album Confident (2015). Evigan and Mac also handled the song's production, with Mitch Allan serving as a vocal producer.

== Background ==
In December 2013, Lovato confirmed that she had started working on her then-untitled fifth studio album Confident. The majority of the album's songs were recorded upon the conclusion of the Demi World Tour in 2015. "Waitin for You" was written by Lovato, Julia Michaels, Jason Evigan, Steve Mac, and Sirah, who appears as the featured artist on the track. It was produced by Evigan, Mac and Mitch Allan. On September 8, 2015, one month prior to Confident's release, Lovato held a listening party in London to give select fans a preview of five songs. Before playing "Waitin for You", Lovato revealed to The Sun that she was inspired by artists such as Rihanna and Nicki Minaj, and was determined to let people know she could not be messed with. Lovato went on to confess that the song was about singers and their various Twitter feuds.

== Composition ==
"Waitin for You" is an R&B song that contains "confrontational lyrics" and explicitly lays bare the singer's fearlessness and confidence. Publications such as Daily Mirror, Latina, Seventeen, and Sugarscape have speculated that Lovato's estranged best friend Miley Cyrus is the subject of the diss track.

== Critical reception ==
"Waitin for You" received generally positive reviews for its empowering and raw content. MTV's Madeline Roth claimed that "just listening to the song is enough to get you fired up". Furthermore, she described it as "a dark track fueled by revenge fantasy". In a track-by-track review of Confident, Merna Jibrail of ANDPOP stated the following about the song, "If there’s a track off the album that had us saying "YAAS," it's this one. It sets a very assertive mood — if that makes any sense." While comparing Sirah's rap to Australian rapper Iggy Azalea's verse on "Kingdom Come", Billboard's Maura Johnston commented that "Sirah's breathy contribution to the vengeful "Waitin for You" blunts the song's stark effect" unlike "Azalea's underwhelming comeback verse". Sputnikmusic noted in a positive review that "Waitin for You" is "the peak of the album" with "killer couplets" that make Taylor Swift's "Bad Blood" seem "quaint and like catty play-fighting in comparison", while deeming Sirah's verse as "atrocious".

== Music video ==
On October 22, 2015, a black-and-white music video for "Waitin for You" directed by Black Coffee was released through Lovato's official Vevo channel on YouTube. As she was seen wearing no make up and a black bomber jacket with her album title printed in the back, Lovato revisits her former middle school, Cross Timbers Middle School, in Grapevine, Texas, where she used to suffer from intense bullying experiences in the past, and struts around the schoolyard confidently while ready to fight. Sirah joins in later during her guest rap verse. Teen Vogue's Hannah Weintraub called the video "one of Demi's most emotional performances we've ever seen and fitting for the personal song about her past". Writing for MTV, Madeline Roth remarked that the clip "is refreshingly raw and understated" in comparison to the "big, glitzy productions" of the first two music videos from the Confident era. She praised it as Lovato's "most powerful" video yet.

== Live performances ==
Lovato and Sirah performed the song live for the very first time on August 13, 2016, at the MGM Grand Garden Arena in Las Vegas during the Future Now Tour.

== Credits and personnel ==
Recording

- Recorded at EastWest Studios, Los Angeles, United States and Rokstone Studios, London, United Kingdom
- Mixed at MixStar Studios, Virginia Beach, United States
- Mastered at Sterling Sound, New York City, United States

Management

- Published by Ddlovato Music (ASCAP), Warner-Tamerlane Publishing Corp. (BMI), Thanks For The Songs Richard (BMI)
- Sirah appears courtesy of Atlantic Recording Corporation

Personnel

- Demi Lovato – lead vocals, songwriter, background vocals
- Julia Michaels – songwriter
- Jason Evigan – songwriter, producer, all instrumentation
- Steve Mac – songwriter, producer, all instrumentation
- Sara Mitchell – vocals, songwriter
- Mitch Allan – vocal producer
- Chris Laws – additional engineering
- Serban Ghenea – mixing
- Tom Coyne – mastering
- Nicholas Mauro – costume design

Credits adapted from Confident album liner notes.

== Chart performance ==
Chart (2015)	Peak position
US Twitter Top Tracks (Billboard)	21
