= Scary Monsters and Nice Sprites =

EP by Skrillex
- Released: October 22, 2010
- Recorded: 2010
- Genres: Dubstep; brostep; electro house; complextro
- Length: 44:02
- Labels: Big Beat; Mau5trap; Atlantic
- Producer: Sonny J.Moore

Skrillex chronology
My Name Is Skrillex (2010)	Scary Monsters and Nice Sprites (2010)	More Monsters and Sprites (2011)

Singles from Scary Monsters and Nice Sprites
- 1. "Scary Monsters and Nice Sprites" Released: October 22, 2010

Scary Monsters and Nice Sprites is the second extended play (EP) by American electronic music producer Skrillex. It was released exclusively through Beatport on October 22, 2010, through Mau5trap and Big Beat Records, while being released on December 20 for digital download via other online retailers and on March 1, 2011, as a physical release. It was recorded in 2010 at Skrillex's apartment using a laptop. The EP features guest contributions from Pennybirdrabbit, Foreign Beggars and Bare Noize as well as remixes done by Noisia, Zedd and Bare Noize. It won two Grammys at the 54th Annual Grammy Awards: one for Best Dance Recording, and another for Best Dance/Electronica Album.

The EP received generally positive reviews from music critics and became a moderate commercial success, reaching number 49 on the Billboard 200, while also topping the Billboard Heatseekers Albums chart and reaching number 28 in Australia. As of November 2011, the EP was certified Gold in Canada with sales exceeding 40,000 copies. The EP's lead single, "Scary Monsters and Nice Sprites", was a moderate commercial success internationally, peaking within the charts of the United States, United Kingdom, Australia, Canada and Sweden. It was later certified Gold by the Recording Industry Association of America (RIAA), with sales exceeding 500,000. On November 30, 2011, it was announced that the EP was nominated at the 54th Grammy Awards for Best Dance/Electronica Album. On February 12, 2012, the album won the Grammy for that category. A follow-up EP, More Monsters and Sprites, contains several remixes of the title track done by Dirtyphonics, Phonat, The Juggernaut and Kaskade. It is named after David Bowie's 1980 album Scary Monsters (And Super Creeps).

== Composition ==
"Scary Monsters and Nice Sprites"
A short sample of "Scary Monsters and Nice Sprites".

According to Jon O'Brien of AllMusic, "[Scary Monsters and Nice Sprites] continues to develop his unforeseen dubstep tendencies". According to Dazed, the EP "marked the birth of brostep outright." According to Andrew Ryce of Resident Advisor, Skrillex is noted for "splitting his EP down the middle with electro house and dubstep". The EP features three remixes with Noisia and Zedd remixing the title track, and Bare Noize remixing Kill Everybody.

== Critical reception ==
Professional ratings
Review scores
Source	Rating
AllMusic	3.5/5 stars
Alternative Press	4/5 stars
MSN Music (Expert Witness)	B+
Resident Advisor	1.5/5
Tom Hull	B+

Scary Monsters and Nice Sprites received generally positive reviews from music critics. Jon O'Brien from AllMusic gave the EP a positive review, saying, "The three remixes from Noisia, Bare Noize, and Zedd are solid if unspectacular, with only the latter's chilled-out version of the title track providing anything wildly different from the originals. But the invention showcased on the first six bass-heavy anthems is more than enough to suggest that the U.S. has found someone who is capable of selling the dubstep sound back to its South London homeland". Alternative Press also gave a positive review, saying, "On Scary Monsters and Nice Sprites, Moore has hit his mash-up groove, combining monster dance riffs with melodic ambience. The EP title is fitting, since these nine tracks (three of which are remixes) embody both sides of Moore; the rambunctious, punk-rock kid who screamed his head off in From First to Last (see the chaos of 'Kill EVERYBODY'), but also the melodic, pensive adult who can seamlessly collaborate with pop singers like Penny and producers and rappers like Bare Noize and Foreign Beggars". Nat Schaefer of The Indiependent said the songs were "quite unlike anything else heard before, and little heard since".

== Track listing ==
No.	Title	Writer(s)	Producer(s)	Length
1.	"Rock 'n' Roll (Will Take You to the Mountain)"	Skrillex	Skrillex	4:44
2.	"Scary Monsters and Nice Sprites"	Skrillex	Skrillex	4:03
3.	"Kill Everybody"	Skrillex	Skrillex	4:58
4.	"All I Ask of You" (featuring Penny)	Skrillex	Skrillex	5:40
5.	"Scatta" (featuring Foreign Beggars and Bare Noize)	Skrillex; Daniel Brown; Oliver Pile; Pavan Mukhi; Ebow Enyan Graham; Dag Torgersbraten; James Miller	Skrillex; Bare Noize	3:55
6.	"With You, Friends (Long Drive)"	Skrillex	Skrillex	6:29
7.	"Scary Monsters and Nice Sprites" (Noisia Remix)	Skrillex	Skrillex; Noisia	3:24
8.	"Scary Monsters and Nice Sprites" (Zedd Remix)	Skrillex	Skrillex; Zedd	5:59
9.	"Kill Everybody" (Bare Noize Remix)	Skrillex	Skrillex; Bare Noize	4:41
Total length:				44:02

Deluxe tour edition
No.	Title	Writer(s)	Producer(s)	Length
10.	"Weekends" (featuring Sirah)	Skrillex; Sara Mitchell	Skrillex	4:45
11.	"Weekends" (Zedd Remix)	Skrillex; Sara Mitchell	Skrillex; Zedd	5:23
Total length:				54:02

== Charts and certifications ==
=== Commercial performance ===
The EP has since become a moderate commercial success. In the United States, it has reached a peak of number forty-nine on the Billboard 200, and has spent more than thirty weeks within the chart. It has also reached the summit of the Billboard Heatseekers Albums chart, as well as number three on the Dance/Electronic Albums. It reached number twenty-eight on the ARIA Charts in Australia.

As of October 3, 2013, the single "Scary Monsters And Nice Sprites" has reached double platinum status, with sales of over 2,000,000 copies

=== Weekly charts ===
Chart (2011–13)	Peak position
Australian Albums Chart	24
Australian Dance Albums Chart	5
Australian Hitseekers Albums Chart	1
Belgian Mid-Price Albums Chart (Flanders)	8
Canadian Albums Chart	24
Japanese Albums Chart	87
Korean International Albums Chart	88
New Zealand Albums Chart	15
Swedish Albums Chart	49
UK Albums Chart	156
UK Dance Albums Chart	11
US Billboard 200	49
US Billboard Catalog Albums	4
US Billboard Dance/Electronic Albums	3
US Billboard Heatseekers Albums	1

=== Year-end ===
Year	Chart	Peak position
2011	Australian Albums Chart	81
2011	Australian Dance Albums Chart	9
2011	US Billboard Dance/Electronic Albums	6
2012	Australian Albums Chart	72
2012	Australian Dance Albums Chart	6
2012	New Zealand Albums Chart	48
2012	US Billboard 200	87
2012	US Billboard Catalog Albums	47
2012	US Billboard Dance/Electronic Albums	7
2013	Australian Dance Albums Chart	38
2013	US Billboard Catalog Albums	46

=== Certifications ===
Region	Certification	Certified units/sales
Australia (ARIA)	Platinum	70,000^{‡}
Canada (Music Canada)	Platinum	80,000^{^}
New Zealand (RMNZ)	Platinum	30,000^{‡}
United States (RIAA)	Platinum	1,000,000^{‡}
^{^} Shipments figures based on certification alone.^{‡} Sales+streaming figures based on certification alone.

== Release history ==
Region	Date	Format	Label	Catalogue
United States	October 22, 2010	Digital download	Mau5trap	MAU5CD004
United Kingdom	November 15, 2010	CD	Mau5trap, Big Beat, Prime Direct	MAU5CD004
Australia	December 20, 2010	Digital download	Big Beat, WEA	-
Canada	December 20, 2010	Digital download	Big Beat, WEA	-
United Kingdom	December 20, 2010	Digital download	Big Beat, WEA	-
United States	December 20, 2010	Digital download	Big Beat, WEA	-
Australia	February 11, 2011	Digital download	Mau5trap, Big Beat	-
United States	March 1, 2011	CD	Big Beat, Atlantic, WEA	5269182
Australia	April 29, 2011	Digital download	Big Beat, WEA	
Australia	April 29, 2011	CD	Big Beat, Atlantic, Neon, Warner, WEA	7567882717
