= Kyoto (Skrillex song) =

Song by Skrillex featuring Sirah

from the album Bangarang
- Released: December 23, 2011
- Recorded: June – August 2011
- Genre: Drumstep; rap metal; brostep; electro house
- Length: 3:21
- Label: Big Beat, Atlantic
- Songwriters: Skrillex, Sirah
- Producer: Skrillex

"Kyoto" is a song by American electronic music producer Skrillex featuring Sirah, taken from his fourth EP as Skrillex, Bangarang. Musically, the song has multiple influences of drum and bass, dubstep and electro house, while also having notable elements of hip hop music and metal music, using "heavy, distorted guitar rhythms" within its composition. The song received generally mixed reviews from music critics, with some criticizing its use of formula in comparison to his previous material. Due to strong digital downloads after the EP's release, the song charted in several countries worldwide, including Australia, Canada, the United Kingdom and United States.

== Leak ==
In early 2011, an unfinished version of the song was leaked under the working title 'Ruffneck Bass' after Skrillex's laptop was stolen while residing in Milan, Italy for a tour. A now-deleted facebook post by Skrillex reads: "Just gonna set it strait. I had 2 laptops and both of my hard drives stolen out of my hotel in Milan Italy last month. On those laptops and drives were all the project files of Skrillex. All gone now. Also I had a new album that is now gone too. I spent a week pulling my hair out but now im just focussing on the future and re making my album."

== Critical reception ==
The song received mixed reviews from music critics, with some criticizing its similarities to his previous material. Jon O'Brien from AllMusic said "Skrillex's lack of progression means there's a distinct sense of déjà vu among its seven tracks, particularly on the relentless, scattershot bleeps, chopped-up vocal hooks, and repetitive loops of opener 'Right In' and the rap-metal fusion of 'Kyoto'". Evan Rytlewski from The A.V. Club gave the song a mixed review, saying that it conveys "high drama without superfluous aggression", however, called it a "sub-Travis Barker stab at rap-rock". Kevin Vincenti from The Cavalier Daily gave the song a negative review, saying "The bland 'Kyoto' is reminiscent of every other average electro-dance song, and it fails to show the genius of its creator."

== Chart performance ==
Due to strong digital downloads after the EP's release, the song charted in several countries worldwide, including Australia, Canada, the United Kingdom and United States. In the United States, it debuted and peaked at number 74 on the Billboard Hot 100. It declined to number 76 the following week, before exiting the chart two weeks later. It made its highest peak on the Canadian Hot 100, where it reached number 59.

== Charts ==
=== Weekly charts ===
Weekly chart performance for "Kyoto"
| Chart (2012) | Peak position |
|---|---|
| Australia (ARIA) | 50 |
| Canada Hot 100 (Billboard) | 59 |
| UK Dance (OCC) | 25 |
| US Billboard Hot 100 | 74 |
| US Dance Digital Song Sales (Billboard) | 5 |

=== Year-end charts ===
Year-end chart performance for "Kyoto"
| Chart (2012) | Position |
|---|---|
| US Dance Digital Song Sales (Billboard) | 27 |

== Certifications ==
Certifications for "Kyoto"
| Region | Certification | Certified units/sales |
|---|---|---|
| Australia (ARIA) | Platinum | 70,000^{‡} |
| New Zealand (RMNZ) | Gold | 7,500^{*} |
| United States (RIAA) | Platinum | 1,000,000^{‡} |
^{*} Sales figures based on certification alone.^{‡} Sales+streaming figures based on certification alone.
