= Crying (Beavis and Butt-Head) =

- Beavis and Butt-Head episode
- Beavis tearing up after smelling an onion
- Episode no.: Season 8 Episode 2
- Directed by: Ted Stearn
- Written by: David Javerbaum
- Production code: 802
- Original air date: October 27, 2011

Episode chronology
← Previous "Werewolves of Highland"	Next → "Daughter's Hand"

"Crying" is the second episode of season 8 and 202nd episode overall of the American animated television sitcom Beavis and Butt-Head. It aired alongside "Werewolves of Highland" on October 27, 2011, on MTV.

== Plot ==
Beavis and Butt-Head watch an episode of The Bachelor. While eating a chili dog, Beavis finds a piece of onion, which causes a tear to run down his face. This drives Butt-Head to believe that Beavis is crying because he finds the show sad. Much to Beavis's chagrin, Butt-Head tells Mr. Van Driessen, Coach Buzzcut, and the other students that Beavis cried, but Beavis denies it.

Flashforwarding 80 years, the duo are seen sitting in wheelchairs in a retirement home where Butt-Head is still mocking Beavis for crying. Butt-Head's laughter brings on a heart attack and he dies. Beavis insists that he was not crying and is not now, either. A cheered-up Beavis then laughs.

== Featured videos ==
- A clip from True Life episode "I'm Addicted to Porn" (3/28/09)
- LMFAO featuring Natalia Kills – "Champagne Showers"

== Reception ==
The episode was seen by 3,286,000 people in its initial airing.

IGN praises the episode's gag and finale and says "The short culminates with a hilarious finale and a gag that's simple, and a little cheap, but perfectly encapsulates the spirit of the unhinged duo." HitFix comments on the episode's plot, saying "But whether they're causing headaches for others or just themselves, the two—and the show—remain very funny", later stating "Beavis and Butt-Head are who they've always been, for ill or (comedically) for good. I'm glad to have them back", when reviewing this episode and "Werewolves of Highland". Assignment X said the episode was "at their simplistic best".
