= Rock 'n' Roll (Will Take You to the Mountain) =

Song by Skrillex

from the EP Scary Monsters and Nice Sprites
- Released: October 22, 2010
- Recorded: 2010
- Genre: Dubstep; electronic rock; electro house; brostep
- Length: 4:44
- Label: Big Beat; Atlantic
- Songwriter: Sonny Moore
- Producer: Skrillex

Music video
- "Rock 'n' Roll (Will Take You to the Mountain)" on YouTube

"Rock 'n' Roll (Will Take You to the Mountain)" is a song recorded by American electronic music producer Skrillex for his second EP, Scary Monsters and Nice Sprites (2010). It was written and produced by Skrillex himself. It was released on October 22, 2010, by Big Beat and Atlantic Records, as the first track from the EP.

The song is considered a fan favorite in Skrillex's repertoire.

== Composition ==
The song opens with a "cheeky, high-pitched robot sound" repeating the line "Hello again, to all my friends / Together, we can play some rock 'n' roll" before "erupting in a bright glitch fantasy."

According to Slate, the song "spins electro, dubstep, and rock into a danceable whirlwind".

== Reception ==
=== Critical reception ===
Jon O'Brien of AllMusic called the song a "chaotic electro-clash". Jason Schreurs of Alternative Press said, "But it’s on 'Rock 'N' Roll (Will Take You To The Mountain)' that Moore will really grab his previous punk audience, with crazy, frenetic sampling and the kind of mash-ups made for the mosh pit." Andrew Ryce of Resident Advisor said, "'Rock N Roll' is like a 2010 update of Justice, blocks of melodic static sliding past hastily carved chunks of strings, synths and snaking guitar riffs."

Kat Bein of Billboard ranked the song at number 20 on her list of Skrillex's best songs, and said it "thrashes like metal, it features his wild vocals, it promises the power of rock, but it has all the glitch and funk of mid-2000s electro weirdness – plus a healthy face smack of dubstep, of course." Edward Tomlin of Singersroom.com ranked the song at number 10 on his list of Skrillex's best songs, and said, "The song features a catchy beat and intricate sound design, with Skrillex’s signature heavy bass drops and vocal samples adding to the track’s driving energy."

=== Commercial performance ===
"Rock 'n' Roll (Will Take You to the Mountain)" did not enter the Hot Dance/Electronic Songs chart, but peaked at number 32 on the Dance Digital Song Sales chart.

== Music video ==
The music video for the song was released on June 20, 2011, and was directed by Jason Ano. It features on-the-road footage and numerous cameo appearances from deadmau5, Steve Aoki, Diplo, and more.

== Other uses ==
=== Live performances ===
Skrillex performed the song live at Coachella 2011, and again at Coachella 2014.

=== In popular culture ===
The song is featured in the 2012 video game Just Dance 4. The song is also featured in the Skrillex Beat Saber DLC pack. The song is also featured in the 2012 video game Lollipop Chainsaw.

== Charts ==
Chart (2012)	Peak position
US Dance Digital Song Sales (Billboard)	32

== Certifications ==
Certifications for "Rock 'n' Roll (Will Take You to the Mountain)"
Region	Certification	Certified units/sales
Canada (Music Canada)	Platinum	80,000^{‡}
United States (RIAA)	Gold	500,000^{‡}
^{‡} Sales+streaming figures based on certification alone.
