= Scary Monsters and Nice Sprites (song) =

Song by Skrillex

from the EP Scary Monsters and Nice Sprites
- Released: October 22, 2010
- Recorded: 2010
- Studio: The Honeycomb (Los Angeles)
- Genre: Dubstep; brostep
- Length: 4:03
- Label: Mau5trap; Big Beat
- Songwriter: Sonny Moore
- Producer: Sonny Moore

Official audio
- "Scary Monsters and Nice Sprites" on YouTube

"Scary Monsters and Nice Sprites" is a song by the American producer Skrillex from his second extended play, Scary Monsters and Nice Sprites (2010). It was released on October 22, 2010, through Mau5trap and Big Beat. The song began as a test for the Native Instruments synthesizer FM8 and was the first written for the EP. A dubstep track, critics noted the contrast between the beginning of the song and its drop.

"Scary Monsters and Nice Sprites" has been used in multiple media and won Best Dance Recording at the 54th Grammy Awards in 2012. The song charted in multiple countries and received double platinum certifications in Australia, Sweden, and the United States. It often appears on critics' rankings of the best electronic dance music (EDM) songs of all time, and is credited for bringing dubstep to a mainstream audience.

== Background and composition ==
The name "Scary Monsters and Nice Sprites" was inspired by the David Bowie album Scary Monsters (and Super Creeps) (1980). According to Noisia, "Scary Monsters and Nice Sprites" started being worked on in their vocal booth when Skrillex was staying with them, writing songs together, in May 2010. Noisia said that, after member Nik showed Skrillex the Native Instruments synthesizer FM8, Skrillex created "FM8 Test". This test song would later become "Scary Monsters and Nice Sprites". Skrillex finished its first draft after he went back home. It was the first track written for Skrillex's second extended play (EP) Scary Monsters and Nice Sprites.

"Scary Monsters and Nice Sprites"
A short sample of "Scary Monsters and Nice Sprites".

"Scary Monsters and Nice Sprites" has been described as a dubstep and brostep song. It is in the key of B♭ Major and has a speed of 140 beats per minute. Kat Bein of Billboard said that the track is "an aural sleight of hand"; though it begins with a high-pitched, "serpentine melody" and "pleasantly fragmented vocal samples", it takes a sharp and surprising turn when the drop occurs at about forty seconds into the track, with "a load of bass bombs sounding like [an] alien invasion". Similarly, Spin described the song as "a slow, disquietingly serene journey up to the top, then the most precipitous of falls, directly down". Jason Schreurs of Alternative Press described the drop as containing "massive breakbeat-breakdowns", while Vice described it as concurrently aggressive and melodic.

Right before the drop, a vocal sample of Rachael Nedrow, also known as "speedstackinggirl", shouting "Yes, oh my gosh!", is used. The sample comes from a video where she speed stacks a set of cups in one of her YouTube videos and breaks her personal time record. Although Nedrow was unaware of its use, she later received royalties. Jon O'Brien of AllMusic said that the sample added a lighter touch to the track amidst its "towering beats and distorted bass".

== Release and reception ==
"Scary Monsters and Nice Sprites" was officially released as the second track from the eponymous EP on October 22, 2010, through Mau5trap and Big Beat. The EP itself contains remixes by Zedd and Noisia. Skrillex's next EP, More Monsters and Sprites (2011), includes remixes by Dirtyphonics, Phonat, The Juggernaut, and Kaskade. On February 12, 2012, the song won Best Dance Recording at the 54th Grammy Awards. That year, the song was used in multiple media, including in the film Spring Breakers, in an ad for GoPro featuring kayaker Ben Brown, and in the video games Major League Baseball 2K12 and Ridge Racer Unbounded.

In the United States, "Scary Monsters and Nice Sprites" spent fourteen weeks on the Billboard Hot 100, peaking at 69, and also peaked on Billboard's Heatseekers Songs at number 3. It was certified double platinum by the Recording Industry Association of America with 2 million certified units. In Canada, the song received a triple platinum certification by Music Canada with 240,000 certified units. In the United Kingdom, the song peaked at 22 on Official Charts Company's UK Dance Singles, receiving a Silver certification by the British Phonographic Industry with 200,000 certified units.

In Australia, it topped the ARIA Charts's Hitseekers and peaked at 56 on their main singles chart. With 140,000 certified sales, it was certified double platinum by the Australian Recording Industry Association. In Sweden, it peaked at 20 on Sverigetopplistan's singles chart and placed 50 on their 2011 year-end chart. It was certified double platinum by the Swedish Recording Industry Association, with 80,000 certified sales. "Scary Monsters and Nice Sprites" appeared in the main charts of France (SNEP) and Norway (VG-lista). Based on streaming figures, the song was certified platinum in Denmark by IFPI Danmark, with 1,800,000 certified units.

== Legacy ==
"Scary Monsters and Nice Sprites" has been described as a highly influential dubstep and electronic dance music (EDM) song; Valerie Lee of Billboard said that it helped the EDM industry to grow, while Michaelangelo Matos of Rolling Stone said that it brought dubstep to the mainstream. Vice said that "it practically made 'the drop' a mainstream term". Billboard's Kat Bein described it as "a generational classic" and one of the most important Skrillex recordings. The song also helped popularize Rachael Nedrow, which is sampled in the track.

"Scary Monsters and Nice Sprites" has been ranked in multiple lists. In 2012, Spin ranked it as the fifth greatest dubstep song of all time. In 2014, Pitchfork named it the 186th best song of the decade until then. In 2015, Spin named it the second greatest electronic dance music (EDM) anthem of the first half of the 2010s. That same year, LA Weekly ranked it the eleventh best dance track in history. In 2016, Kat Bein of Billboard chose it as the best song in Skrillex's discography. In 2017, Vice ranked it as the best EDM song of all time. In 2019, Billboard staff considered it one of the 100 songs that defined the decade and the ninth greatest dance song of the decade. In 2022, Rolling Stone named it the 64th greatest dance song of all time. In 2025, Billboard named it the 11th best dance song of all time.

In 2019, a study published in Acta Tropica suggested that playing "Scary Monsters and Nice Sprites" could make Aedes aegypti mosquitoes, which transmit the dengue fever, attack hosts later and less often as well as mate "far less often". The song was chosen because it mixes very high and very low frequencies.

== Charts ==
=== Weekly charts ===
weekly chart performance
Chart (2011–2013)	Peak position
Australia (ARIA)	56
Australia Hitseekers (ARIA)	1
Canada Hot 100 (Billboard)	66
France (SNEP)	71
Norway (VG-lista)	18
Sweden (Sverigetopplistan)	20
UK Dance (Official Charts)	22
US Billboard Hot 100	69
US Heatseekers Songs (Billboard)	3

=== Year-end charts ===
Year-end chart performance
Chart (2011)	Position
Sweden (Sverigetopplistan)	50

Chart (2012)	Position
US On-Demand Songs (Billboard)	39

== Certifications ==
Certifications for "Scary Monsters and Nice Sprites"
Region	Certification	Certified units/sales
Australia (ARIA)	2× Platinum	140,000^{‡}
Canada (Music Canada)	3× Platinum	240,000^{‡}
New Zealand (RMNZ)	Platinum	30,000^{‡}
Sweden (GLF)	2× Platinum	80,000^{‡}
United Kingdom (BPI)	Silver	200,000^{‡}
United States (RIAA)	2× Platinum	2,000,000^{‡}
Streaming
Denmark (IFPI Danmark)	Platinum	1,800,000^{†}
^{‡} Sales+streaming figures based on certification alone.^{†} Streaming-only figures based on certification alone.
