= The Late Late Show (American talk show) =

American television talk and variety show (1995–2023)

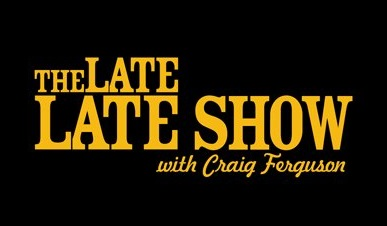
- Second and final logo for Craig Ferguson's iteration of the program, used from 2009 to 2014
- Genre: Late-night talk show; Variety show
- Created by: David Letterman; Peter Lassally
- Presented by: Tom Snyder; Craig Kilborn; Craig Ferguson; James Corden
- Country of origin: United States
- Original language: English
- No. of episodes: 777 (under Snyder); 1,190 (under Kilborn); 2,058 (under Ferguson); 124 (under guest hosts); 1,197 (under Corden); Total: 5,346

Production
- Production locations: Television City, Los Angeles, California; Edinburgh & Glasgow, Scotland (7 episodes); Central Hall, Westminster, London, UK (7 episodes)
- Camera setup: Multi-camera
- Production companies: Worldwide Pants Incorporated (1995–2015); Fulwell 73 (2015–2023); CBS Productions (1995–2006); CBS Paramount Television (2006–2009); CBS Television Studios (2009–2015); CBS Broadcasting (2015–2021; 2022–2023); CBS Studios (2021–2022)

Original release
- Network: CBS
- Release: January 9, 1995 – April 27, 2023

Related
- Late Show; The Tomorrow Show

The Late Late Show is an American late-night television talk and variety comedy show that originally aired from January 9, 1995, to April 27, 2023, on CBS. Tom Snyder was the show's first host, followed by Craig Kilborn, Craig Ferguson, and James Corden. The show originated from Television City in Los Angeles. At 2,058 episodes over the course of nine years, the longest incarnation of the show was under Craig Ferguson as host, between January 2005 and December 2014.

== History ==
=== Tom Snyder (January 9, 1995 – March 26, 1999) ===
Tom Snyder hosted the program from its inception in January 1995 until March 1999. The choice of Snyder as host was made by David Letterman, whose contract with CBS gave him (via production company Worldwide Pants) the power to produce the show in the time slot immediately after his own program and who had an affinity for Snyder, whose NBC late night series Tomorrow had been succeeded by Late Night with David Letterman. The time slot on CBS previously carried repeats of Crimetime After Primetime. Snyder departed CNBC to host The Late Late Show on CBS.

Snyder's show featured a mix of celebrities, politicians and other newsmakers, but was otherwise quite unlike the program hosted by Letterman; Snyder was a former newsman, not a comedian, and his show featured an intimate interview format with no studio audience present, similar to his old Tomorrow show of the 1970s, or to Charlie Rose show and Later, which had abandoned the format the previous year and had followed Late Night under Letterman on NBC. Though the show lacked a studio audience, Snyder still frequently gave extended conversational monologues, many of which contained jokes that prompted audible laughter from the off-camera production staff. Without the need for an audience, the show originated from the intimate Studio 58 at CBS Television City.

Throughout most of the show's run, it was also simulcast over some CBS Radio stations, and Snyder accepted calls from viewers/listeners somewhat in the manner of Larry King; to accommodate this, the show was broadcast live in the Eastern and Central United States and on radio in the west, a rarity for late-night talk shows that had otherwise transitioned to tape, though due to existing syndication contracts and resistance to give up local control of timeslots, many stations, such as WJZ-TV in Baltimore, would delay it to as late as 3:05 a.m. When Snyder was on vacation, the show featured guest hosts such as Jon Stewart or Janeane Garofalo.

Saxophonist David Sanborn composed and performed the theme music and several other songs featured on the show, all of which were smooth jazz pieces to fit the show's low-key, middle-of-the-night mood. Sanborn had previously been a guest saxophonist in The World's Most Dangerous Band during Late Night with David Letterman. Unlike other late-night shows, The Late Late Show did not have a house band (a tradition that carried on to its iterations under Kilborn and Ferguson) or any announcer, except for the last episode, when Snyder allowed one of his staff members to announce an introduction.

Letterman had offered the Late Late spot to Garry Shandling, a former permanent guest host of The Tonight Show, but Shandling turned the offer down in favor of The Larry Sanders Show. (NBC had previously approached Shandling about succeeding Letterman on Late Night, but he had also declined that offer. The job ultimately went to Conan O'Brien). Letterman also offered the slot to Later host Bob Costas who also declined. Shandling lampooned the selection process on an episode of The Larry Sanders Show entitled Life After Larry in which Snyder is poached from the post-Letterman timeslot for the spot following the fictional Sanders show.

Letterman then insisted on Snyder despite CBS wanting a younger host with a comedy background and a more traditional late night talk variety format. In 1998, the network reportedly reasserted its desire for a host who could attract a younger demographic and asked Worldwide Pants not to renew Snyder's contract when it expired in September 1999, though other reports portray the decision to leave as Snyder's decision, with Snyder informing management that he wished to depart before his contract ended, as early as January 1999. Snyder returned to CBS to guest-host some episodes of the Late Show while Letterman recuperated from heart surgery in 2000.

Longtime late night television producer Peter Lassally was executive producer of Snyder's iteration of the program and mentored Jon Stewart when he was a guest host filling in for Snyder.

=== Craig Kilborn (March 30, 1999 – August 27, 2004) ===
When Snyder announced he was leaving, the show was reformatted to resemble Letterman and other major late-night talk programs. Craig Kilborn took over in March 1999, having left The Daily Show (where he was succeeded by Jon Stewart) to become the new Late Late Show host; previously, he was an anchor on ESPN's SportsCenter. Kilborn left the program on August 27, 2004, two weeks after surprising executives at CBS and Worldwide Pants by announcing after several weeks of talks that he was not seeking a contract renewal. In a June 2010 interview, Kilborn stated that he left late-night television due to his belief that the late-night time slot was too crowded for him to succeed. Executive Producer Peter Lassally later said that Kilborn quit because he did not get the raise he wanted.

=== Transition (September 20 – December 31, 2004) ===
With Kilborn only announcing in early August that he would not be returning to the Late Late Show in the fall, CBS and Worldwide Pants executives decided to have a series of guest hosts helm the show in on-air auditions. While initially saying they would choose a permanent host by the end of October, the process ended up extending into December. Drew Carey was the first guest host on September 20, 2004, and again the following night. Subsequent guest hosts included: Jason Alexander, Jeff Altman, Tom Arnold, Michael Ian Black, Tom Caltabiano, Adam Carolla, Tom Dreesen, David Duchovny, Damien Fahey, Craig Ferguson, Jim Gaffigan, Ana Gasteyer, David Alan Grier, D. L. Hughley, Lisa Joyner, Donal Logue, Rosie Perez, Ahmad Rashad, Jim Rome, Aisha Tyler, and The Late Late Show head writer Michael "Gibby" Gibbons culminating in four finalists being involved for week long final tryouts: Craig Ferguson, D. L. Hughley, Damien Fahey, and Michael Ian Black. It was announced on December 7, 2004, that Ferguson, a Scottish comedian best known from his role as Mr. Wick on The Drew Carey Show, was to become Kilborn's permanent replacement. David Letterman later said he made the selection based on the recommendation of Peter Lassally.

Following the conclusion of the on-air auditions on December 3, 2004, guest hosts continued to fill out the roster until the end of the year and included Jason Alexander, Donal Logue, David Alan Grier, Aisha Tyler, Drew Carey, Sara Rue, John Witherspoon, Joe Buck, Susan Sarandon, Don Cheadle, Daryl Mitchell, Bob Saget, Jim Rome, Ana Gasteyer, Damien Fahey, and D. L. Hughley.

=== Craig Ferguson (January 3, 2005 – December 19, 2014) ===
Under Craig Ferguson's tenure as host, the show started with a cold open, followed by opening credits and a commercial break. A loose comic monologue then followed, consistently including a greeting ("Welcome to Los Angeles, California, welcome to the Late Late Show, I am your host, TV's Craig Ferguson") and the proclamation that "It's a great day for America, everybody!".

From 2010 the monologue also included banter with Geoff Peterson, his "robot skeleton sidekick", voiced and controlled by Josh Robert Thompson. This animatronic was constructed by the MythBusters' Grant Imahara but went through many revisions, the most important was the regular live control and voicing by Thompson. This changed the dynamic of the show as Ferguson had a recurring 'sidekick' to banter with. After another commercial break, the banter continued with Ferguson sitting behind a desk. He usually read and responded to viewer e-mail and (beginning in February 2010) Twitter messages for random responses to viewer questions. During segments Ferguson occasionally received phone calls (voiced by Thompson) from a variety of characters, including celebrities, the 'very shy' band (Alfredo Sauce and the Shy Fellas) allegedly hiding behind the set's curtain, room service, a duplicate Geoff, and Miriam, a possible stalker who confused Ferguson with former host Craig Kilborn. Ferguson called his Twitter followers his "robot skeleton army."

Generally one or two celebrities were interviewed; Ferguson started each by dramatically ripping up note cards written for the interview, "signalling to the audience, and to the guest, that this conversation need not be rigidly managed." At the end of an interview, Ferguson usually asked his guest to engage in one of various rituals; options included "Awkward Pause", "Mouth Organ", "Guess What the Queen Is Thinking", the "Big Cash Prize," or simply joining Ferguson in throwing Frisbees at the show's "horse," Secretariat (actually two interns dressed in a pantomime horse costume). Occasionally Craig requested Thompson (as Geoff) to interpret the thoughts of Secretariat or others, in one of a variety of celebrity voices, most notably Morgan Freeman. During a guest appearance, Morgan Freeman described Thompson's prompted vocal impression of himself as "impeccable". Sometimes the show featured a stand-up comedian or a musical guest, the latter of which was typically pre-taped.

Ferguson interviews Kathy Griffin on The Late Late Show, January 2014

Ferguson incorporated various running gags. Early examples included themed weeks such as "Crab Week", "Magic Week" and "Shark Week". Shark Week was apparently a reference to Shark Week on the Discovery Channel, and that channel, saying that Ferguson has always loved Shark Week, scheduled him for an appearance on August 4, 2010. A "photo of Paul McCartney" joke (wherein Ferguson called for a photo of McCartney, which was actually a photo of actress Angela Lansbury and vice versa); the show often used variations of this gag featuring other pairs of look-alike celebrities, such as Cher being shown as Marilyn Manson, and a picture of Ann Coulter being shown whenever Ferguson requested a photo of Tom Petty. The show ended with "What Did We Learn on the Show Tonight, Craig?", a segment that started with an animation of a kitten and in which Ferguson "removes his tie, puts his feet on his desk, and summarizes the preceding hour of TV." Since the introduction of the Geoff character, Ferguson usually discussed the day's lesson with the robot.

Ferguson's tenure included the show's first high definition broadcast, on August 31, 2009. In March 2010, the Late Late Show won the Peabody Award for Excellence in Television for its "Evening with Archbishop Desmond Tutu" episode. According to the Peabody Board, "the Scottish-born Ferguson has made late-night television safe again for ideas." The show had Peter Lassally as its executive producer through Ferguson's entire tenure. Lassally had previously been executive producer of The Tonight Show Starring Johnny Carson, Late Night with David Letterman, and Late Show with David Letterman. In April 2012, CBS announced that they had reached an agreement with Ferguson to extend his contract through 2014. As part of the deal, the network began co-producing The Late Late Show for the first time. From the beginning of Ferguson's tenure as host until August 8, 2012, The Late Late Show continued to originate from Studio 58 at CBS Television City, as it had dating back to the show's origins under Snyder. Ferguson often joked about the studio's small size, leaky roof, and poor lighting. On August 27, 2012, the program moved down the hall to the much larger Studio 56. Though the look of the main desk set was similar to the one in Studio 58, the extra space in Studio 56 allowed for more audience seating, a fireplace set for Geoff Peterson, an entrance & monologue set, a musical performance area, as well as a stable set for the show's pantomime horse, Secretariat.

==== Ferguson's departure ====
Ferguson's contract was set to expire in June 2014. His contract called for him to be first in line to replace David Letterman as host of The Late Show. Because CBS chose Stephen Colbert for that position, Ferguson reportedly received a windfall of as much as US$10 million (equivalent to $13.4 million in 2025).

On April 28, 2014, Craig Ferguson announced he would leave The Late Late Show at the end of the year. He had reportedly made the decision prior to Letterman's announcement but agreed to delay making his own decision public until the reaction to Letterman's decision had died down. He had also originally intended to leave in the summer of 2014 but agreed to stay until the end of the year to give CBS more time to find a successor. His last show was December 19, 2014, and began with Ferguson performing "Bang Your Drum" with many of his guests over the years banging drums, including Desmond Tutu. The show featured Jay Leno as Ferguson's guest and cameos by Bob Newhart and Drew Carey in the closing segment, a parody of the finales of Newhart, The Sopranos and St. Elsewhere.

=== Transition (January 5 – March 6, 2015) ===
In the interim between Ferguson's departure in December 2014 and James Corden's premiere on March 23, 2015, CBS scheduled a number of guest hosts to helm the program. Repeats of Ferguson's show finished out 2014. Drew Carey hosted the week of January 5 and did so again the week of March 2, while CBS daytime talk show The Talk aired a special week of The Talk After Dark episodes on the week of January 12. Other guest hosts included Judd Apatow, Will Arnett, Wayne Brady, Whitney Cummings, Jim Gaffigan, Billy Gardell, Sean Hayes, Thomas Lennon, John Mayer, Kunal Nayyar, Adam Pally, Jim Rome, Lauren Graham, and Regis Philbin. Peter Lassally remained executive producer during this period and retired from television after a six decade career with the taping of Arnett's show on February 20, 2015, in which Lassally appeared in a cameo. Shows that aired for the rest of February, into March, had been pre-recorded in January for later broadcast in order to give CBS time to dismantle the Ferguson set and traditional audience seating, and build out a new set and audience arrangement for Corden's show. Shows taped by Cummings, Philbin, and Pally originated from New York and were recorded without an audience from Studio 57 at the CBS Broadcast Center, the home studio for CBS This Morning. Repeats were to fill out the two weeks between the final new Carey-hosted show on March 6 and the premiere of Corden's show on the 23rd.

=== James Corden (March 23, 2015 – April 27, 2023) ===
On September 8, 2014, CBS announced that James Corden would succeed Ferguson as host on March 23, 2015. His show, originally slated to premiere on March 9, 2015, was delayed by CBS to March 23, 2015, in December 2014, in order to use the NCAA basketball tournament as a means of promoting Corden's debut, and prevent a situation where two episodes would be pre-empted during the first week of the tournament. Corden's hosting tenure was the first to have a house band (the lack thereof having been a running joke during Ferguson's tenure); Reggie Watts served as the franchise's first and only bandleader.

David Letterman's contract included the right to control the time slot that follows his and produce the Late Late Show and it was his production company, Worldwide Pants, which selected previous hosts. With Letterman's departure, CBS became the sole producer of the show. In keeping with customs employed on British chat shows such as The Graham Norton Show, Corden interviewed all of the nightly guests at once, opting for a more conversational style and reducing the format's emphasis on U.S. fixtures such as desks and an opening monologue. Many of the show's segments, including the recurring Carpool Karaoke (where Corden sang with celebrity guests in a car), became viral videos online, with the show's YouTube channel having the second-highest number of subscribers among all associated with American late-night talk shows.

On April 28, 2022, Corden announced that he would step down as host in 2023, stating that "I always thought I’d do it for five years and then leave, and then I stayed on. I’ve really been thinking about it for a long time, thinking whether there might be one more adventure."

== Retirement and replacement ==
In February 2023, Deadline Hollywood reported that CBS was considering using Corden's departure to reevaluate the future of The Late Late Show as a franchise, with the network considering alternative formats for the time slot that would be cheaper to produce than a traditional talk show. That month, the network reportedly settled on a Stephen Colbert-produced revival of @midnight, a social-media-themed panel show aired by sibling Comedy Central from 2013 through 2017, bringing an end to The Late Late Show franchise after 28 years.

Due to the 2023 Hollywood labor disputes, CBS acquired reruns of Byron Allen's Comics Unleashed in September 2023 to fill the Late Late Show time slot in the interim, with a mix of reruns and unaired first-run episodes. In November 2023, CBS officially announced that After Midnight, hosted by stand-up comedian Taylor Tomlinson, would premiere on January 16, 2024. After Midnight had been renewed for a third season when Tomlinson decided to focus full-time on her standup career, leading CBS to instead announce in March 2025 that the show would be canceled after two seasons, with Comics Unleashed repeats returning in September.

== List of hosts ==
Host	Start date	End date	Tenure	Episodes
Tom Snyder	January 9, 1995	March 26, 1999	4 years, 76 days	777
Craig Kilborn	March 30, 1999	August 27, 2004	5 years, 150 days	1,190
Guest hosts^{[a]}	September 20, 2004	December 31, 2004	102 days	79
Craig Ferguson	January 3, 2005	December 19, 2014	9 years, 350 days	2,058
Guest hosts^{[b]}	January 5, 2015	March 6, 2015	60 days	45
James Corden	March 23, 2015	April 27, 2023	8 years, 35 days	1,197

Notes

- ^{^[a]} Jason Alexander, Jeff Altman, Tom Arnold, Michael Ian Black, Tom Caltabiano, Drew Carey, Adam Carolla, Tom Dreesen, David Duchovny, Damien Fahey, Craig Ferguson, Jim Gaffigan, Ana Gasteyer, David Alan Grier, D. L. Hughley, Lisa Joyner, Donal Logue, Rosie Perez, Ahmad Rashad, Jim Rome, Aisha Tyler, Sara Rue, John Witherspoon, Joe Buck, Susan Sarandon, Don Cheadle, Daryl Mitchell, Bob Saget, and Michael "Gibby" Gibbons (head writer)
- ^{^[b]} Drew Carey, Julie Chen, Sara Gilbert, Sharon Osbourne, Sheryl Underwood, Aisha Tyler, Jim Gaffigan, Judd Apatow, Regis Philbin, Whitney Cummings, Adam Pally, Sean Hayes, John Mayer, Wayne Brady, Tom Lennon, Lauren Graham, Will Arnett, Billy Gardell, and Kunal Nayyar
