= George Gray (television personality) =

American game show host and comedian

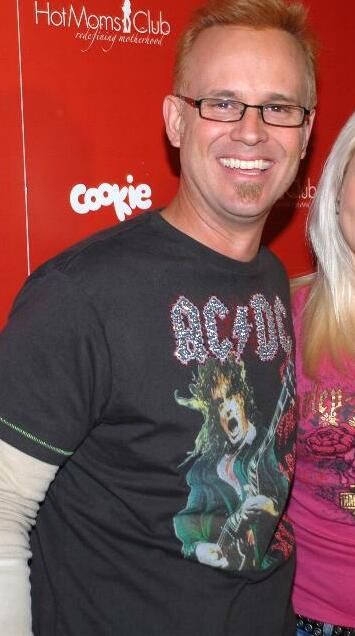
- Gray in 2007
- Born: George Edward Gray III; March 11, 1967 (age 59); Ballwin, Missouri, U.S.
- Education: University of Arizona
- Occupations: Television personality; game show host; comedian; announcer; actor; musician
- Years active: 1987–present
- Spouse: Brittney Green (m. 2019; div. 2025)
- Website: www.georgegray.com

George Edward Gray III (born March 11, 1967) is an American television personality, actor, and comedian. He is best known for hosting the game shows Extreme Gong and Weakest Link. Gray also has been the announcer of The Price Is Right since 2011.

== Early life and career ==
Born in Ballwin, Missouri, Gray attended high school in Tucson, Arizona, and graduated from the University of Arizona. In college, he played drums with local band The Reason Why with his two English buddies Tony Randall and Shane Lamont. After working as a sketch and stand-up comedian, Gray's first television hosting gig was for the Fox Movie Channel doing a show called FXM Friday Nights. He then appeared as co-host of the series Movies For Guys Who Like Movies on TBS.

== Hosting career ==
Gray's first in-studio show was Extreme Gong, an updated version of The Gong Show, on GSN in the late 1990s. He also hosted the first season of the American version of Junkyard Wars, which was nominated for a prime-time Emmy.

Gray was chosen in 2001 by NBC Enterprises to host the daily syndicated American version of the game show The Weakest Link, which aired from 2002–03. TV critic Steve Rogers likened Gray's hosting style to the demeanor of a "class clown", in contrast to the "severe schoolmarm" attitude of original The Weakest Link host Anne Robinson.

After hosting the reality series Todd TV on FX and the GSN special National Lampoon's Greek Games, in late 2004, Gray went on to become the co-host of NBC's $25 Million Dollar Hoax. He hosted ESPN's reality sports competition I'd Do Anything. Beginning in 2006, Gray hosted the HGTV show What's with That House? (a.k.a. That House), as well as HGTV's Manland and the building competition Summer Showdown.

== The Price Is Right ==
After previously appearing with a group of rotating auditioning announcers, Gray officially became the fourth regular announcer on The Price Is Right on April 18, 2011, succeeding Rich Fields.

On January 15, 2015, Gray fell off of a treadmill that he was describing during the show. Gray continued to describe the treadmill despite falling down, adding that "Aspirin (was) not included". The video quickly went viral.

== Personal life ==
Gray married Brittney Green on April 13, 2019. The couple divorced in January 2025, citing “irreconcilable differences”.

=== Health ===
On the morning of April 20, 2020, Gray was hospitalized after suffering from three major heart attacks. He woke up with the chest pains and thought it was indigestion, but his condition deteriorated. Gray suffered his first heart attack on the way to the hospital, his second after failed surgeries as he was walking around in the hospital, and his third as doctors were going to place a third stent in his heart. The surgeons then performed a quadruple bypass.

== Select filmography ==
=== Television ===
- 2002–03, The Weakest Link, host
- 2004, I'd Do Anything, host
- 2011, Car Science, narrator, 5 episodes
- 2011–present, The Price Is Right, announcer
- 2012, The Young and the Restless as newscaster, 1 episode
- 2016, Scorpion as himself
- 2022, The Bold and the Beautiful as Waiter, 1 episode

=== Film ===
- 1987, Cant Buy Me Love as Bobby Hilton
- 1994, Dead Beat as Cop Outside
- 2011, eCubid as TV announcer
- 2011, Jack and Jill as The Price Is Right announcer
- 2012, It's a Boy! as Baby 1

=== Music video ===
- 2013, Bob Dylan: Like a Rolling Stone as himself
