= Sirah (rapper) =

American rapper

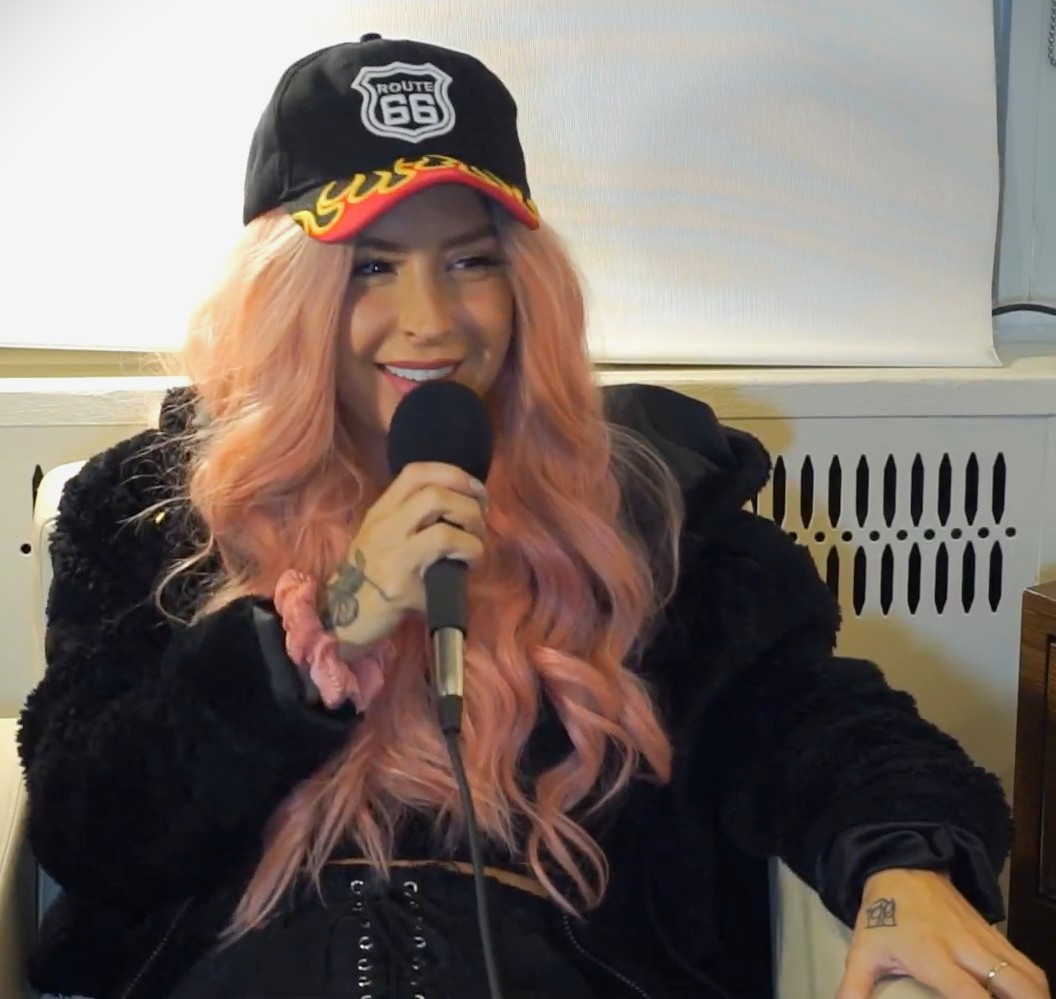
- Sirah in 2019

Background information
- Also known as: Sirah One; Sirah Oner
- Born: Sara Elizabeth Mitchell; July 28, 1988 (age 37); Levittown, New York, U.S.
- Genres: Hip hop; pop; moombahton; electronic
- Occupations: Rapper, singer
- Years active: 2007–present
- Labels: Warner; Atlantic; Owsla; Pulse Recordings; Broken Complex
- Website: sirahmusic.com

Sara Elizabeth Mitchell (born July 28, 1988), better known by her stage name Sirah (/ˈsaɪrə/ SY-rə), is an American rapper and singer from Los Angeles. She collaborated with Skrillex, on "WEEKENDS!!!", "Kyoto", and the hit single "Bangarang".

== Background ==
Mitchell was born on Long Island, New York, to a bluesman and an artist. Her youth included poverty, homelessness and alcoholism. She was repeatedly caught creating graffiti; she stopped after being arrested for it. She moved to Washington with her father at age six, but after he died of an overdose, she ended up returning to New York. There, she was arrested several times and eventually absconded to Los Angeles rather than be placed in foster care at age fifteen. For a while, she considered Union Station her home before purchasing a Jeep Cherokee and living in it in a garage in East Los Angeles; in an interview, she stated that she lived out of her car and felt safe in doing so.

== Career ==
Mitchell moved from singing to rapping after her mother gave a negative review of her voice, and mentioned that the turning point for her was when she heard Big Pun's Capital Punishment.

After moving to Los Angeles, she booked her own tours in such countries as Germany and Romania, sleeping on floors and collecting money from fans. Her first EP, Clean Windows Dirty Floors, was produced by DJ Hoppa. Her first LP, Smile You Have Teeth, was never released. Prior to its intended release, Mitchell's manager sent her a contract demanding $30,000 from the LP's proceeds. She subsequently decided to abandon the album and start anew.

Skrillex contacted her MySpace, commending her work and requesting that they work together. The first track, "WEEKENDS!!!", resulted when Skrillex asked her to rap her some lyrics she was developing into his laptop. Their second collaboration, "Bangarang", happened after he called her while he was on tour and asked her to record 16 bars about the Lost Boys. She forgot to close the window before recording it, and thus birds are audible in the recording. Sirah has also released a mixtape, C.U.L.T.: Too Young to Die. After that she released another EP, Inhale.

== Achievements ==
At the 55th Annual Grammy Awards, Mitchell and Skrillex won the award for Best Dance Recording for their collaboration Bangarang. It is Mitchell's first Grammy win.

== Influences ==
Mitchell is influenced by Joni Mitchell, Big Pun, WHY?, Qwel, Black Thought, Erykah Badu, Lauryn Hill, Jewel, and Cat Stevens.

== Discography ==
=== Albums ===
Title	Details
Broken Complex (with Broken Complex)	Released: October 26, 2010; Label: Broken Complex; Formats: Digital download, CD

=== Mixtapes ===
Title	Details	Tracks
C.U.L.T.	Released: March 2, 2012; Label: Pulse Recordings; Formats: Digital download, CD	1. "Up & Down"; 2. "My City"; 3. "Motel Bible"; 4. "Blew Your Mind"; 5. "Game On" (featuring JT); 6. "Like Me Now"; 7. "Black Eyes"; 8. "C.U.L.T."; 9. "Love You Down"
C.U.L.T.: Too Young to Die	Released: September 24, 2012; Label: Pulse Recordings/Atlantic Records; Formats: Digital download, CD	1. "Up & Down"; 2. "My City"; 3. "Motel Bible"; 4. "Blew Your Mind"; 5. "Like Me Now"; 6. "Made It"; 7. "When I'm Gone"

=== EPs ===
Year	Album	Label
2007	Clean Windows Dirty Floors (with DJ Hoppa)	Broken Complex
2011	Trick'd	Unsigned
2013	Inhale	Pulse Recordings / Atlantic Records

=== Singles ===
==== As lead artist ====
Song	Year	Album
"God's Grace" (with DJ Hoppa)	2011	
"Deadbeat" (featuring Skrillex)	2017	
"Say My Name"	2017	
"Shots"	2018	
"Sinner"	2018	
"Room"	2019	

==== As featured artist ====
List of singles as featured artist, with selected chart positions and certifications, showing year released and album name
Song	Year	Peak Chart Positions										Certifications	Album
Song	Year	US	US Dance Digital Sales	AUS	AUT	BEL (FL)	CAN	GER	NZ	SWE	UK	Certifications	Album
"WEEKENDS!!!" (Skrillex featuring Sirah)	2010	—	25	—	—	—	93	100	—	—	—	RIAA: Gold; MC: Gold	My Name is Skrillex
"Bangarang" (Skrillex featuring Sirah)	2012	72	7	4	25	9	26	55	14	24	24	RIAA: 3× Platinum; ARIA: 7× Platinum; BEA: Gold; BPI: Platinum; GLF: Platinum; IFPI AUT: Platinum; MC: Platinum	Bangarang
"Speakerbox" (The Juggernaut featuring Sirah)	2013	—	—	—	—	—	—	—	—	—	—		Non-album single
"Lilies" (Lupe Fiasco featuring Sirah)	2014	—	—	—	—	—	—	—	—	—	—		Lost in the Atlantic
"Visionary" (Rain Man featuring Sirah)	2015	—	—	—	—	—	—	—	—	—	—		Non-album singles
"Memories" (KSHMR & Bassjackers featuring Sirah)	2015	—	—	—	—	—	—	—	—	—	—		Non-album singles
"Memories" (MJ featuring Sirah)	2016	—	—	—	—	—	—	—	—	—	—		
"Stop Me" (Wiwek featuring Sirah)	2016	—	—	—	—	—	—	—	—	—	—		The Free & Rebellious
"Daddy" (Born Dirty featuring Sirah)	2017	—	—	—	—	—	—	—	—	—	—		HOWSLA
"Text Me Back" (TQX featuring KOOL a.D & Sirah)	2018	—	—	—	—	—	—	—	—	—	—		Global Intimacy
"Stick Up" (AYERS featuring Sirah)	2020	—	—	—	—	—	—	—	—	—	—		
"Bad Bitch" (Kiiddo_sounds. featuring Sirah)	2021	—	—	—	—	—	—	—	—	—	—		
"Down To Ride" (Chip Makahl featuring Sirah)	2021	—	—	—	—	—	—	—	—	—	—		
"Real Shit" (Hass Hammoud featuring Sirah)	2022	—	—	—	—	—	—	—	—	—	—		
"COLD BLOODED" (GANG SIGN featuring Sirah)	2022	—	—	—	—	—	—	—	—	—	—		
"Turn Up" (Hass Hammoud featuring Sirah)	2022	—	—	—	—	—	—	—	—	—	—		

=== Other charted and certified songs ===
List of other charted songs, with selected chart positions and certifications, showing year released and album name
Song	Year	Peak Chart Positions						Certifications	Album
Song	Year	US	US Dance Digital Sales	US Twit.	AUS	CAN	UK	Certifications	Album
"Kyoto" (Skrillex featuring Sirah)	2011	74	5	—	50	59	175	RIAA: Platinum; ARIA: Platinum	Bangarang
"Waitin' for You" (Demi Lovato featuring Sirah)	2015	—	—	21	—	—	—		Confident

=== Other appearances ===
Title	Year	Other artist(s)	Album	Ref.
"Kyoto"	2011	Skrillex	Bangarang	
"Survival"	2012	Alvin Risk	Infinity	
"Hotel Confidential"	2015	MAX	Ms. Anonymous	
"Waitin' for You"	2015	Demi Lovato	Confident	
"Detox"	2016	TY1, Eamon	Hardship	
"Mug Shot"	2016	MAX	Hell's Kitchen Angel	
"Up In Smoke"	2016	Wolfgang Gartner, A-Trak	10 Ways To Steal Home Plate	
"Go Go Go"	2017	Verbs	The Progress EP 2: Fuck Yea Man	
"Renditions"	2017	Destruct	Rebel Minded (10 Year Anniversary Edition)	
"Zoloft"	2017		UROK	
"Love Was Never Enough"	2018	RILEY	Love Was Never Enough	
"Bonkers"	2018	SNAILS	SLIMEAGEDDON	
"Shit Talk"	2022	DVRKO	Undone	
