= First of the Year (Equinox) =

2011 single by Skrillex

Single by Skrillex

from the EP More Monsters and Sprites
- Released: June 7, 2011
- Recorded: 2011
- Genre: Dubstep
- Length: 4:22
- Label: Big Beat
- Songwriter: Skrillex
- Producer: Skrillex

Skrillex singles chronology
"Get Up!" (2011)	"First of the Year (Equinox)" (2011)	"Ruffneck (Full Flex)" (2011)

Music video
- "First of the Year (Equinox)" on YouTube

"First of the Year (Equinox)" is a song by American electronic music producer Skrillex. It was released on June 7, 2011, as the lead single from his third EP, More Monsters and Sprites. The song has since become a moderate commercial success, peaking within the charts of the United States, Australia, Canada, Norway and Sweden. A music video directed by Tony Truand, produced by HK Corp, premiered on August 10, 2011, and was nominated at the 54th Grammy Awards for Best Short Form Music Video. The music video was nominated for the MTV Video Music Award for Best Electronic Dance Music Video and it won the award for Best Visual Effects in a Video at 2012 MTV Video Music Awards.

== Music video ==
The official music video for the song was made available for download on iTunes on August 10, 2011. The video was produced by French company HK Corp and directed by Tony Truand. It was released on Skrillex's official YouTube channel on August 17, 2011, and has accumulated more than 420 million views.

The video focuses on a pedophile who takes notice of and follows a young, innocent-seeming girl as she skips down the street and descends into an underground area. Following downstairs, he pulls out a cloth and douses it with chloroform. Just as he is about to attack, she screams "Call 911 now!" and begins telekinetically manipulating his body, raising him into the air, contorting him into various positions, slamming him against walls and shooting black smoke into and through his body. It is revealed that a dark figure, reminiscent of the slender figure in the Come to Daddy music video, is directly behind the child making identical gestures. The child's eyes turn the same color black as the figure. The suggestion is that the child is in fact some kind of avatar/golem being used by the creature to lure and punish child predators. Ultimately the child makes a final twisting motion with her hands, indicating she has killed the man. She is then shown using her finger to add a pitch black mark to a tally on the wall, adding another victim of her justice to the count (at least 75).

=== Critical reception ===
Spin complimented the video, saying "It's one thing to empathize with at-risk kids, or to speak up for them generally, but Skrillex takes it a step further -- and then further still -- in this stunning new video for the track 'First of the Year (Equinox).'" And went on to say "But in this clip, the song's melodic preamble also serves as an ominous backdrop for a creepy, would-be predator who's lurking outside a playground where young children are frolicking. The day is overcast, but something much darker is in the air, as a little girl leaves and the man stalks after her. When she unexpectedly skips off to a dark, abandoned warehouse, he continues to follow, eventually entering a room where she's standing alone, holding a telephone receiver. The keyboards suddenly fade into a glitchier groove, and then, at the 1:25 mark, well, you gotta see for yourself."

The music video was nominated for Best Short Form Music Video at the 54th Grammy Awards. The video was nominated for the MTV Video Music Award for Best Electronic Dance Music Video and it won the award for Best Visual Effects in a Video at 2012 MTV Video Music Awards, awarded to VFX supervisors the Deka Brothers. The video is featured in "Werewolves of Highland", the first episode of season 8 of Beavis and Butt-head. The song is also used by Argentinian TV channel TV Pública to promote the matches of the 2012 Torneo Inicial.

== Samples ==
"First of the Year" samples Equinox, an demo track recorded by Moore in 2008. The vocal sample was pitch adjusted, reversed, sped-up, vocoded and rearranged, making it nearly indistinguishable. The song also samples a viral video from 2005, which features a woman screaming "Call 911 now", and was used without permission from the original author.

== Charts ==
=== Weekly charts ===
Chart (2011–2012)	Peak position
Australia (ARIA)	84
Belgium (Ultratip Bubbling Under Flanders)	7
Canada Hot 100 (Billboard)	88
France (SNEP)	187
Norway (VG-lista)	14
Sweden (Sverigetopplistan)	19
US Billboard Hot 100	85

=== Year-end charts ===
Chart (2011)	Position
Sweden (Sverigetopplistan)	83
Chart (2012)	Position
Sweden (Sverigetopplistan)	74

== Certifications ==
Region	Certification	Certified units/sales
Canada (Music Canada)	2× Platinum	160,000^{‡}
Mexico (AMPROFON)	Gold	30,000^{*}
New Zealand (RMNZ)	Platinum	30,000^{‡}
Sweden (GLF)	2× Platinum	80,000^{‡}
United States (RIAA)	Platinum	1,000,000^{‡}
Streaming
Denmark (IFPI Danmark)	Platinum	1,800,000^{†}
^{*} Sales figures based on certification alone.^{‡} Sales+streaming figures based on certification alone.^{†} Streaming-only figures based on certification alone.
