= List of Ed episodes =

Ed is a television program that aired on NBC from 2000 to 2004. The hour-long comedy-drama starred Tom Cavanagh as the titular character Edward "Ed" Stevens. It also starred Julie Bowen as his love interest Carol Vessey, Josh Randall as his friend Dr. Mike Burton, Jana Marie Hupp as Mike's wife Nancy, Lesley Boone as their friend Molly Hudson, and Justin Long as awkward high-school student Warren Cheswick. The series was created by executive producers Jon Beckerman and Rob Burnett. It was co-produced by David Letterman's Worldwide Pants Incorporated, NBC Productions and Viacom Productions. Ed ran for four seasons, airing a total of 83 episodes.

== Series overview ==
Season	Episodes	Originally released	
Season	Episodes	First released	Last released
1	22	October 8, 2000	May 23, 2001
2	22	October 10, 2001	May 15, 2002
3	22	September 25, 2002	April 11, 2003
4	17	September 24, 2003	February 6, 2004

== Episodes ==
=== Season 1 (2000–01) ===
No. overall	No. in season	Title	Directed by	Written by	Original release date	U.S. viewers (millions)
1	1	"Pilot"	James Frawley	Jon Beckerman & Rob Burnett	October 8, 2000	16.46
Ed Stevens is fired from his high-paying New York City law firm for misplacing a comma, and comes home to find his wife sleeping with a mailman. Feeling understandably down he decides to move back to his hometown of Stuckeyville, Ohio. He moves in with his best friend Mike Burton and his wife Nancy. Ed attempts to get his high school crush, Carol Vessey to fall in love with him. In the process he takes her to the local bowling alley, Stuckeybowl, and Carol mentions she likes the bowling alley, and Ed consequently buys it and turns the pro shop into his own law firm.
2	2	"The World of Possibility"	Marc Buckland	Rob Burnett	October 15, 2000	10.63
An evil Masked Magician (John Cariani) begins revealing the trade secrets of the town's beloved magician, Stuckeyville Stan (Eddie Bracken). Ed is hired to defend the aging trickster's honor, making Stuckeyville Stan his first client. Ed comes to find the one piece of evidence that could save Stuckeyville Stan's reputation is Carol's childhood diary, and uncovers her schoolgirl crush. Meanwhile, Phil has taken charge for the grand re-opening of Stuckeybowl.
3	3	"Just Friends"	Marc Buckland	Jon Beckerman	October 22, 2000	13.07
With less than normal lawyers by his side, Ed goes to court over a contract written on a bar napkin by four high school friends. When one of the friends strikes it rich and denies the contract, he hires a big-city law firm as his counsel, which just happens to be the same firm that fired Ed. Meanwhile, Ed has the daunting task of finding a manager for Stuckeybowl and realizes his only choices are Phil, Kenny or Shirley.
4	4	"Pretty Girls And Waffles"	Kevin Dowling	Rob Burnett	October 29, 2000	12.25
When Carol realizes that her longtime boyfriend (Gregory Harrison) just is not fun enough for her, she decides to break up with him. Meanwhile, Ed represents an attractive woman (Joanna Going), whose employer, a fast-talking used-car salesman (Peter Gerety), has been slipping extra money in her paychecks and now sues her to get back for almost $5,000.
5	5	"Better Days"	Marc Buckland	Rob Burnett & Jon Beckerman	November 5, 2000	10.65
Ed makes another attempt to win over Carol's newly broken heart, and later finds himself commiserating with Nick. Since attendance at Stuckeybowl has not been good, Ed goes with Phil's idea for a commercial directed by Phil. Meanwhile, Nancy tries to plan some mind-expanding activities with Mike.
6	6	"Home Is Where The Ducks Are"	Bethany Rooney	Jon Beckerman	November 12, 2000	10.28
Carol announces that she will leave Stuckeyville to pursue her dream of being a writer. Ed gets caught up in the town's heated mayor's race, while Phil takes a young Stuckeybowler (Samm Levine) as his "apprentice".
7	7	"Something Old, Something New"	Lawrence Trilling	Andrea Newman & Rob Burnett	November 19, 2000	10.55
Ed gives a Thanksgiving feast at Stuckeybowl. He misses his soon-to-be-ex Liz, while Carol feels the same about ex-boyfriend Nick. Ed urges Carol to spend Turkey Day at the bowling alley with him and his pals to cheer her up. Ed's current client is a Halloween prankster injured by his crotchety target. And Phil is devising a cash making scam to sell "fine Corinthian turkeys".
8	8	"The Whole Truth"	Peter Lauer	Bob Brush & Jon Beckerman	December 6, 2000	11.96
Molly's grandfather (Edmund Lyndeck) hires Ed to write his will and reveals a shocking secret about his past. Mike faces off at the office and Phil hosts an open-mike night at Stuckeybowl.
9	9	"Your Life Is Now"	Marc Buckland	Mike Schwartz & Rob Burnett & Jon Beckerman	December 20, 2000	11.87
Carol cannot help but feel a tad insecure when she comes face to face with Troy, the star quarterback who dumped her and grew up to have a "perfect" life. Ed offers advice to kindred spirit Warren (Justin Long), whose nerd vs. jock conflict mirrors his own with Troy.
10	10	"Losing Streak"	Adam Bernstein	Michele Fazekas & Tara Butters	January 10, 2001	11.08
Ed's parents make a surprise visit to Stuckeyville and openly show disappointment that he left his successful life in Manhattan to practice law in Stuckeyville. Meanwhile, Carol volunteers as coach of the failing girl's JV basketball team at the high school despite the fact that she has never played the game before. Ed defends three men who tricked their friend into believing he won $20 million in the lottery.
11	11	"Opposites Distract"	Tim Van Patten	Jon Beckerman & Rob Burnett	January 17, 2001	12.54
Sparks fly when Ed goes head-to-head with an assistant district attorney, Bonnie Haine (Rena Sofer). Molly chides Carol for taking Ed for granted. Phil searches for his personal catch phrase.
12	12	"Hook, Line and Sinker"	Arlene Sanford	Jon Beckerman & Rob Burnett	January 24, 2001	12.20
The assistant district attorney, Bonnie Haine, that Ed butted heads with in the previous episode drops her case and asks him out, which irritates Carol because she thinks Ed automatically assumed she would be jealous. Mike is convinced his babysitter has a crush on him. Phil invites the cast of Happy Days to Stuckeybowl.
13	13	"The Music Box"	Marc Buckland	Jon Beckerman & Rob Burnett	February 7, 2001	12.20
Ed is torn between Carol and his romance with assistant district attorney Bonnie, but his relationships really get awkward when he tries to retrieve Carol's expensive stolen music box by pushing Bonnie to get involved – allowing the two women to finally meet and size each other up. Warren tries to join a bowling league team with a pretty classmate and instead is forced to sign up with a team of older, unkempt members.
14	14	"Valentine's Day"	Alan Myerson	Randy Cohen & Rob Burnett & Jon Beckerman	February 14, 2001	12.19
Although she awakens in Ed's bed, frosty Bonnie hurts the bowling-alley lawyer's feelings when she does not act much like a lover. To complicate matters, Ed shares the intimate details with long-time crush Carol. Ed also agrees to represent a dedicated reverend whose church president wants to terminate him after 30 years because he feels the clergyman's preaching style is outdated. Elsewhere in Stuckeyville, Phil launches a speed-dating club for love-starved local yokels.
15	15	"Loyalties"	Rick Wallace	Jon Beckerman & Rob Burnett	February 20, 2001	9.77
Ed senses trouble when Big Rudy (John Goodman), former owner of Stuckeybowl wants to buy back Stuckeybowl. Ed's fast-track romance with Bonnie takes a detour when she is offered an exciting job in Washington, D.C. Carol reluctantly ends up "dating" a handsome young man whom Molly has been eyeing. In court, Ed represents a female rocker (Paige Price) who was kicked out of her band.
16	16	"Live Deliberately"	Adam Bernstein	Rob Burnett & Jon Beckerman	February 28, 2001	11.54
Ed is obsessed with matching any deed or athletic achievement from his teenaged years. Warren tries to impress Jessica with his studious knowledge of Henry David Thoreau's simplified lifestyle. In addition, the ever-enterprising Phil urges Ed to cut him in on a percentage of Stuckeybowl's profits.
17	17	"Exceptions"	Kevin Dowling	Michele Fazekas & Tara Butters & Jon Beckerman & Rob Burnett	March 28, 2001	12.78
Carol recruits Ed to argue on behalf of her prized student (Martin Starr). Mike's professional skills as a doctor are challenged when he is humiliated by his older, more sadistic colleague, Dr. Jerome. Shirley coaxes a skeptical Ed to give her a tryout as his official legal assistant.
18	18	"The Test"	Tim Van Patten	Rob Burnett & Jon Beckerman	April 4, 2001	10.91
Ed represents his former high school girlfriend Cara. Carol launches a campaign to win back school funding for the high school's music program and its veteran teacher, Barbara (Anne Meara) when budget cuts make it expendable. An uneasy Nancy suspects that nanny Carmella is not qualified to take care of her baby and intends to find out more about her.
19	19	"Windows of Opportunity"	Bob Berlinger	Will McRobb & Chris Viscardi & Rob Burnett & Jon Beckerman	May 2, 2001	9.88
Ed urges Carol to help him convince a young couple from getting married in his bowling alley on a whim because he fears they have not taken the time to properly know each other for the long run. Meanwhile, Ed goes to court on behalf of an excessively overweight man who seeks a restraining order against his well-intentioned brother who resorts to outright bullying to prevent his sibling from eating himself into an early grave. In addition, moony Warren asks out Donna Tuzzi.
20	20	"Mind over Matter"	Marc Buckland	Jon Beckerman & Rob Burnett	May 9, 2001	9.44
Ed wants the bowling alley designated as a landmark. Molly chills her promising new relationship with a hunk when she learns that her beau had first asked out Carol. Ed welcomes a group of old-timers who annually rent out the lanes for a reunion.
21	21	"Mixed Signals"	Alan Myerson	Jon Beckerman & Rob Burnett	May 16, 2001	10.24
As the Stuckeybowl crew prepares for a "Vegas Night" themed shindig at the bowling alley, Carol disputes Ed's well-intended advice to nerdy Warren urging him to abandon caution and ask out the girl of his dreams to the school prom. Ed represents a teed-off golfer who blew a match's prize money on the last putt when a nearby fan heckled him. In addition, Mike is reluctantly drafted into arranging a tribute banquet to honor Dr. Jerome.
22	22	"Prom Night"	Marc Buckland	Jon Beckerman & Rob Burnett	May 23, 2001	9.95
Ed continues to draw closer to Carol when he agrees to help her chaperone at the high school prom. A dateless Warren considers hiring a hooker to accompany him to the prom. Phil believes he has found his true calling as a TV host of a hidden camera show.

=== Season 2 (2001–02) ===
No. overall	No. in season	Title	Directed by	Written by	Original release date	U.S. viewers (millions)
23	1	"The Stars Align"	Kevin Dowling	Jon Beckerman & Rob Burnett	October 10, 2001	12.28
Ed is shocked to see his ex-flame Bonnie appears on his doorstep just as he was going to kiss Carol. Ed is called on to represent Warren in court when the teen is arrested for supplying beer at a party where a fellow student is injured. Nancy is driven to distraction by her domestic duties. And a pony is delivered to the alley ordered by Phil, who is nowhere to be found.
24	2	"Changes"	Tim Van Patten	Rob Burnett & Jon Beckerman	October 17, 2001	10.55
Ed cools off Carol after the new principal, Dennis, becomes quite the pain in her side. Ed is curious when asked by an odd stranger to help him legally change his name and identity. Mike is about to blow his top with the insufferable Dr. Jerome, the old coot surprises him. Molly is intrigued by an affable bowling alley salesman whose magic tricks could charm the pants off her. Phil's latest get-chicks-quick scheme has him posing a la famous magician David Blaine.
25	3	"A Job Well Done"	Rob Thompson	Jonathan Groff	October 24, 2001	11.14
Molly gets frustrated with Ed when he represents a rude clothing store owner (David Garrison) who is being sued for sexual harassment by a former saleswoman who had to wear skimpy garments on the job – but when Ed learns the truth, the presiding judge (Charles Dumas) will not let him back out. Mike pressures an overwhelmed Nancy to have a second baby. Phil embarks on a quest to retrieve a bowler's prized ball which was lost somewhere in the pin-sweeping machinery.
26	4	"Crazy Time"	Kevin Dowling	Rob Burnett & Jon Beckerman	October 31, 2001	9.07
Ed gets upset when he learns that Dr. Crazy (Evan Handler), a famed but depressed children's TV entertainer hired to emcee, encourages a trusting child to run away from home — and when the child complies, Ed is hired by the boy's parents to sue the personality for abusing his status as a youth role model.
27	5	"Closure"	Melanie Mayron	Tom Spezialy	November 7, 2001	10.91
Ed re-thinks his decision to leave his ex-wife (Melissa Errico) and arranges his first meeting with her since he caught her cheating with a mailman. Molly overthinks her budding romance with a bowling alley repairman (Patrick Finn) and fears getting hurt.
28	6	"Replacements"	Timothy Busfield	Rob Burnett & Jon Beckerman	November 14, 2001	10.65
Ed finds competition with another "bowling alley lawyer" (Neil Patrick Harris), who begins stealing his clients. Carol is frustrated with Dennis' latest rude behavior. Warren tries to impress a girl by joining the wrestling team.
29	7	"The New World"	Sandy Smolan	Chris Dingess	November 21, 2001	9.10
Ed is asked by Dennis to represent him after a fender-bender. Meanwhile, Ed tries to resurrect the annual Thanksgiving Day parade – he also takes notice of the budding relationship between Dennis and Carol.
30	8	"Goodbye Sadie"	Mel Damski	Rob Burnett & Jon Beckerman	December 5, 2001	8.50
Ed represents a teacher who refused to cast a student in the school based on him being African-American. Elsewhere, Warren gets a makeover.
31	9	"Charity Cases"	Adam Bernstein	Kevin Murphy	December 12, 2001	10.28
Stuckeyville's leading philanthropist asks Ed to play elf to his Santa when he decides to give away his fortune to the locals. But Ed's cheer earns him jeers when he learns that the gifts have depleted the eccentric multi-millionaire's charitable foundation.
32	10	"Small Town Guys"	Kevin Dowling	Story by : Yahlin Chang; Teleplay by : Jon Beckerman & Rob Burnett	January 9, 2002	9.99
Ed represents a loser who is sued by a woman for breach of privacy after she rejected his romantic overtures and found her photo posted on his website. Elsewhere, Mike finally gives vent to his full emotions about Dr. Jerome when the older man betrays him. In addition, Warren mistakenly believes that the way to Jessica's heart is to become the school buffoon.
33	11	"Two Days of Freedom"	Arlene Sanford	Jon Beckerman & Rob Burnett	January 16, 2002	10.61
Ed is perplexed when a middle-aged couple (Vincent Pastore and Andrea Martin) hire him to supervise the husband's 48-hour birthday present of total freedom to do anything he wants. Carol and Dennis patch up their romantic split. Warren finally gets a date with Jessica.
34	12	"Ends and Means"	Kevin Dowling	Tom Spezialy & Kevin Murphy	January 30, 2002	10.77
Ed begins dating a free-spirited claims adjuster (Reiko Aylesworth) and agrees to represent her when her former employer accuses her of embezzling thousands of dollars. Nancy tires of her housebound baby-care duties and seeks to become a part-time substitute teacher until she runs afoul of her fellow teachers for going outside the bounds of course instruction. Phil hatches a scheme to host birthday parties at the alley with a "celebrity roast" theme.
35	13	"Youth Bandits"	Juan Campanella	Rob Burnett & Jon Beckerman	February 6, 2002	9.96
Ed learns of the death of a teen friend with whom he formed a band while they were students. Molly tries to convince scamming Phil over the graduation finish line when he tries to obtain a high school equivalent degree.
36	14	"Things To Do Today"	James Frawley	Jon Beckerman & Rob Burnett	February 27, 2002	11.82
Ed is intrigued by the romantic antics of a beautiful and flirtatious young woman (Kelly Ripa). Carol frets when she learns that Warren has captured a private moment of hers on videotape.
37	15	"Nice Guys Finish Last"	Arvin Brown	Kevin Etten & Jacob Lentz	March 6, 2002	11.34
Ed wants to help a lawyer win his first case against a trucking firm that has re-routed giant semi-trailer rigs to rumble through peaceful Stuckeyville. Carol makes the mistake of asking Dennis to read her short story before she submits it to a famous visiting writer (Keir Dullea).
38	16	"Wheel of Justice"	Mel Damski	Jon Beckerman & Rob Burnett	March 27, 2002	9.40
Ed represents Carol when she is forced to sing "Bad, Bad Leroy Brown" in front of court, when a judge begins deciding his clients sentence based on spinning a wheel.
39	17	"Lloyd"	Timothy Busfield	Rob Burnett & Jon Beckerman	April 3, 2002	9.91
Ed's troublesome brother Lloyd (Timothy Busfield) comes to town and convinces him to give Stuckeybowl a "night club" makeover.
40	18	"Trust"	Guy Ferland	Yahlin Chang	April 10, 2002	9.12
Ed defends Mike when he is slapped with a sexual harassment charge from a nurse.
41	19	"The Shot"	Gloria Muzio	Jon Beckerman & Rob Burnett	April 24, 2002	8.53
Ed gathers all the parties of the championship basketball game he blew with a missed shot.
42	20	"Power of the Person"	Timothy Busfield	Jon Beckerman & Rob Burnett	May 1, 2002	9.47
Carol convinces Ed to coach the Quiz Bowl team in the hopes it will inspire an underachieving student to join, which Dennis finds offensive.
43	21	"Memory Lane"	Rob Thompson	Jon Beckerman & Rob Burnett	May 8, 2002	9.02
Ed realizes he may lose Carol when he learns she and Dennis plan to live together, and that Dennis plans to propose.
44	22	"Last Chance"	Timothy Busfield	Rob Burnett & Jon Beckerman	May 15, 2002	9.11
Ed discovers Carol and Dennis plan on going on a cross country trip together, and Ed realized he has one last chance to win her over.

=== Season 3 (2002–03) ===
No. overall	No. in season	Title	Directed by	Written by	Original release date	U.S. viewers (millions)
45	1	"Human Nature"	Timothy Busfield	Jon Beckerman & Rob Burnett	September 25, 2002	10.31
Carol and Dennis return from their trip, and Carol drills Ed on his goodbye kiss. A scammer (Danny DeVito) becomes Ed's newest client. Ed hires a new employee to the bowling alley, an energetic man by the name of Eli (Daryl Mitchell).
46	2	"Ms. Stuckeyville"	Don Scardino	Jon Beckerman & Rob Burnett	October 2, 2002	10.12
Carol decides to tell Ed that Dennis proposed, but he just laughs and does not believe her. Diane becomes a candidate for Ms. Stuckeyville. Back at the alley, Eli and Phil begin to clash.
47	3	"The Road"	Jamie Babbit	Drake Sather	October 16, 2002	10.33
Ed decides to hit the road with a traveler who passes through the town. Carol and Dennis plan their wedding. Nancy becomes the new guidance counselor. Phil challenges Eli to a game of basketball in back of the alley.
48	4	"Charlotte and Wilbur"	Oz Scott	David Richardson	October 23, 2002	10.38
Carol's dad (Dan Lauria) comes to visit and she worries about how he will take the news that she is engaged. Ed steps in for Eli in a jitterbug dancing contest.
49	5	"The Divorce"	Timothy Busfield	Jon Beckerman & Rob Burnett	October 30, 2002	9.83
Ed steps in to help two radio show stars (Horatio Sanz and Chris Parnell) separate from their longtime partnership.
50	6	"May the Best Man Win"	Gloria Muzio	Chris Dingess	November 6, 2002	11.07
Dennis asks Ed to be his best man, leading Ed to plan an outrageous bachelor party to embarrass him. Meanwhile, the free-spirited Jennifer (Kelly Ripa) returns and tries to win back Ed.
51	7	"The Wedding"	Vincent Misiano	Rob Burnett & Jon Beckerman	November 13, 2002	12.58
While Carol and Dennis' big day has arrived, Ed is unsure about what his role in it should be. Jennifer intends to help him. Carol's little sister comes to town and starts up an unlikely romance with Warren.
52	8	"Trapped"	Kevin Sullivan	Jon Beckerman & Rob Burnett	November 20, 2002	13.32
Tired of dealing with Ed and Carol's problems, Mike locks the two of them inside the bowling alley and will not release them until they settle out their differences. Phil intends to force Eli to ask out a local girl by beating him in a game of Scrabble.
53	9	"Makeovers"	Don Scardino	Jon Beckerman & Rob Burnett	December 11, 2002	10.91
Ed's brother Lloyd returns with a new plan to get rich, this time selling male makeup. Mike and Warren try to help Mark lose weight after his father suffers a heart attack.
54	10	"Neighbors"	Tim Van Patten	Kevin Etten	December 18, 2002	9.47
Mike and Ed develop a plan to bring the whole town back together again after Ed takes on the case of two neighbors suing each other. Eli and Phil hatch a scheme to make Phil the spokesman for the local sandwich shop.
55	11	"Frankie"	Timothy Busfield	Jessica Queller	January 8, 2003	10.91
A new attorney named Frankie (Sabrina Lloyd) catches Ed's eye. Warren and Diane ask for Eli's help in making Mark a feast of all of his favorite things before he has his gastro-bypass surgery.
56	12	"Partners"	Adam Bernstein	Drake Sather	January 15, 2003	9.98
While Ed and Frankie start up as partners against crime, Mike is finding his new practice being sabotaged by his old partner, Dr. Jerome.
57	13	"Hyenas & Wildebeests"	Rick Stevenson	Chris Dingess	January 22, 2003	10.41
Ed represents Carol when she is sued by an old classmate, who believes past actions of his affected her terrible review of his restaurant.
58	14	"The Case"	Allison Liddi-Brown	Kevin Etten	February 5, 2003	9.75
Eli asks Ed to defend his friend who is charged with the accidental death of an old friend when they attempted an old high school prank. Molly finds herself becoming interested in a student's father (Tom Wilson), whose son seems to be ignoring him for video games.
59	15	"Blips"	Rob Burnett	Jon Beckerman & Rob Burnett	February 12, 2003	9.26
Ed obsesses over his legacy when he receives an estimate on how long he will live. A famous artist (Tim Matheson), and ex of Carol's sister Stella (Nicki Aycox), comes to town in hopes of getting her back, while Warren has the same agenda.
60	16	"Good Advice"	Tom Cavanagh	Jessica Queller	February 19, 2003	8.93
Frankie defends Ed when his random act of kindness gets him sued, while Carol insults him when she comments on his relationship with Frankie.
61	17	"Captain Lucidity"	Babu Subramaniam	Jon Beckerman & Rob Burnett	February 26, 2003	9.72
Ed attempts to figure out all his problems by having a lucid dream, and revisiting his past, conjuring up Taye Diggs in the process.
62	18	"Business as Usual"	Timothy Busfield	Aaron Ehasz	March 5, 2003	8.76
While Ed and Frankie's relationship heats up, Mike and Dr. Jerome fight over their practice's sign.
63	19	"Baby Sitting"	Allison Liddi-Brown	Dan Schofield	March 12, 2003	9.15
Ed babysits Nancy and Mike's kids, but soon has to call in Carol for help, while Nancy and Mike find their getaway bed and breakfast to not be quite what they had in mind. Guest star: Molly Shannon.
64	20	"Second Chances"	Tim Van Patten	Jon Beckerman & Rob Burnett	March 28, 2003	9.98
Frankie learns of Ed's longtime longing for Carol. Eli pays a visit to the man who bought his restaurant after he had his accident.
65	21	"The Movie"	Timothy Busfield	Rob Burnett & Jon Beckerman	April 4, 2003	10.39
Tensions arise between Ed and Frankie when Carol makes her move to win him back. Ed allows a shoestore owner (Christopher Lloyd) to make a movie in the bowling alley.
66	22	"The Decision"	Rob Burnett	Jon Beckerman & Rob Burnett	April 11, 2003	11.22
Ed has to choose between Carol and Frankie. Mike seeks Ed's help when a young college student starts coming on to him.

=== Season 4 (2003–04) ===
No. overall	No. in season	Title	Directed by	Written by	Original release date	U.S. viewers (millions)
67	1	"New School"	Don Scardino	Jon Beckerman & Rob Burnett	September 24, 2003	10.72
While Ed and Carol attempt to sort out their new relationship by planning their first date, the Burtons go about buying a puppy. Eli gets eyes for a local pie maker.
68	2	"New Car Smell"	Rob Burnett	Rob Burnett & Jon Beckerman	October 1, 2003	8.24
The episode is seen through the lens of Ed's cousin's camera, as Ed agrees to let him film a documentary about him. The movie heats up when Ed and Carol decide to move in together.
69	3	"The Dream"	Tom Cavanagh	Kenny Lenhart & John J. Sakmar	October 8, 2003	7.99
Ed and Mike decide to act on their childhood dream of owning a racehorse. Carol has her hands full with Warren, who is rapidly approaching his SATs.
70	4	"History Lessons"	Alan Myerson	Andrew Dettmann	October 15, 2003	7.14
Ed tries to preserve the historical significance of a local revolutionary war battle while he is busy checking out Carol's ex-boyfriend.
71	5	"Death, Debt, Dating"	Stephen Williams	Constance M. Burge	October 22, 2003	7.61
Molly meets an exciting stranger, while Ed faces a difficult civil suit.
72	6	"The Offer"	Allison Liddi-Brown	Chris Dingess	October 29, 2003	8.70
An old student turned famous writer visits Carol and is impressed with her writing, and convinces her to meet a magazine editor in New York for an interview.
73	7	"Goodbye Stuckeyville"	Don Scardino	Barb Makintosh	November 5, 2003	8.97
As Carol struggles to decide whether to take the writing job in New York, Ed flirts with the idea of selling the bowling alley to go with her.
74	8	"Therapy"	Jon Beckerman	Rob Burnett & Jon Beckerman	November 12, 2003	9.29
Ed seeks professional help on his relationship with Carol with a doctor recommended to him by Mike.
75	9	"The Proposal"	Don Scardino	John J. Sakmar & Kenny Lenhart	November 19, 2003	9.52
Ed decides to propose to Carol when she comes back to Stuckeyville for Thanksgiving, but struggles to get it right.
76	10	"Just a Formality"	Sarah Pia Anderson	Kevin Etten	December 10, 2003	7.74
Carol asks Ed to ask permission from her father to propose to her, even though he already did.
77	11	"Home For Christmas"	Tim Matheson	Andrew Deetman	December 17, 2003	7.93
Ed is tempted by an old classmate back in Stuckeyville for the holidays. Mike and Nancy hope to have their new house finished for the holidays.
78	12	"The Process"	Tom Cavanagh	Constance M. Burge	January 7, 2004	8.15
Carol struggles to come up with three chapters of a novel. Mike appoints himself "Decision Master" of The Burton household.
79	13	"Back in the Saddle"	Jason Ensler	Kevin Etten & Chris Dingess	January 9, 2004	8.15
Ed's ex-wife, Liz (Lea Thompson), asks Ed for help with her new business.
80	14	"Hidden Agendas"	Allison Liddi-Brown	Kenny Lenhart & John J. Sakmar	January 16, 2004	6.58
Ed's ex-wife Liz continues to interfere with Ed's and Carol's lives.
81	15	"Pressure Points"	Michael Slovis	Barb Makintosh & Lisa Michelle Payton	January 23, 2004	7.87
Mike's father (Burt Reynolds) shows up on Mike's doorstep after getting the boot from his wife. Ed feels inadequate when he is unable to stop a mugger from taking Carol's engagement ring.
82	16	"Best Wishes"	Marc Buckland	Constance M. Burge & Andrew Dettmann	January 30, 2004	7.15
Ed's brother Lloyd (Timothy Busfield) returns and brings his normal troubles to Stuckeyville. Tensions spark between Carol and Stella (Nicki Aycox), her sister. Warren walks in on Carol in the shower, after sleeping with Stella.
83	17	"Happily Ever After"	Rob Burnett	Rob Burnett & Jon Beckerman	February 6, 2004	8.19
The wedding day is finally here for Ed and Carol, but both struggle to find a way to make it perfect. Note: The creators/executive producers, Jon Beckerman and Rob Burnett, make a cameo appearance as reception guests at Carol and Ed's wedding.
