= Worldwide Pants =

American television and film production company

Worldwide Pants Incorporated
- Type: Private
- Industry: Television and film production company
- Genre: Entertainment
- Founded: 1991; 35 years ago
- Founder: David Letterman
- Headquarters: 30 Rockefeller Center, New York City, New York (1991–1993); Ed Sullivan Theater, New York, New York (1993–2015); 10696 Wilshire Blvd, Los Angeles, California (2015–present), United States
- Key people: David Letterman (chairman); Rob Burnett (president and CEO)
- Products: Late Night with David Letterman, Late Show with David Letterman, The Late Late Show with Craig Ferguson, Everybody Loves Raymond
- Owner: David Letterman
- Number of employees: 70 (2007)
- Subsidiaries: Clear Entertainment (C.E. Music); B&B Productions

Worldwide Pants Incorporated is an American television and film production company founded and owned by comedian and talk show host David Letterman.

The company was formerly headquartered at the Ed Sullivan Theater building in New York City but has since moved to Los Angeles following the ending of the Late Show with David Letterman. The president and CEO is former Late Show executive producer Rob Burnett. Peter Lassally, a former The Tonight Show Starring Johnny Carson and Late Show executive producer, was the senior vice-president until his retirement.

== History ==
=== 1990s ===
A predecessor company, Space Age Meats, produced Letterman's first television talk show, The David Letterman Show in 1980. This company was also credited with producing Late Night with David Letterman, produced in partnership with NBC and Johnny Carson's Carson Productions from 1982 to 1990. Carson continued to be credited with production of that show until his retirement in 1992. The predecessor company also signed a deal with Walt Disney Studios for feature films.

Worldwide Pants' first production credit was for Late Night in 1991, shortly after its formation. The company, then known as Worldwide Pants Productions, shared a 1991 Peabody Award, for their ability to "take one of TV's most conventional and least inventive forms—the talk show—and infuse it with freshness and imagination."

In 1993, the company produced two shows: one was the sitcom The Building, starring Bonnie Hunt, and the other was the new late night program Late Show with David Letterman, both on CBS. Although the former flopped, the latter succeeded for a 22-year run until 2015. In 1995, Worldwide Pants launched The Late Late Show franchise, starting with one hosted by Tom Snyder, then with Craig Kilborn, and then with Craig Ferguson, who served the longest, and finally James Corden. Worldwide Pants produced these Late Late Show iterations until 2015. Also that year, it teamed up with Bonnie Hunt again to start out Bonnie, which lasted one season on CBS.

In 1996, Worldwide Pants achieved greater success in primetime with the launch of Everybody Loves Raymond, which was successful and critically acclaimed for nine seasons. In 1997, David Kissinger, who was senior vice president of comedy and drama series department of Walt Disney Television, joined Worldwide Pants as vice president of the studio.

=== 2002–2006 ===
A 2002 Forbes article comments on the approach Letterman takes for Worldwide Pants television productions:

Letterman's approach is to nurture an idea with seed money from his production company, then get someone else to pay for the rest of it. He isn't particularly hands-on once the programs get past the initial stages, but his imprimatur carries weight with network buyers. "They've got a point of view about everything they do," says Chris Albrecht, president of original programming at HBO. "These guys are making television every night and have been for a long time. You feel more comfortable with them."

The company produced its first film, Strangers with Candy, a prequel to the TV show of the same name. The film premiered at the 2005 Sundance Film Festival, within the "Park City at Midnight" category. Warner Independent Pictures subsequently signed up as North American distributor of the film, before ThinkFilm acquired the rights from Warner, giving it a limited release in summer 2006. The film grossed slightly more than $2 million, on a $2 million production budget and $1.5 million prints and advertising budget.

In April 2005 the Sci-Fi Channel announced that Worldwide Pants would produce a half-hour animated ensemble comedy for the channel from Brendon Small, called Barbarian Chronicles. A subsequent interview with Small confirmed there were no plans to go through with the deal.

=== 2007 WGA strike ===
Production of new episodes of the company's two late-night CBS talk shows ceased on November 5, 2007, when the Worldwide Pants writers joined the strike against the Alliance of Motion Picture and Television Producers (AMPTP), the trade association of which Worldwide Pants is a member.

During the first part of the strike reruns of Worldwide Pants shows were aired. This changed when Worldwide Pants broke ranks with the AMPTP by negotiating an independent, interim collective bargaining agreement with the Writers Guild of America in which Worldwide Pants essentially agreed to operate in accordance with the contract demands of the WGA for the duration of the labor dispute. The agreements automatically reverted to the final contract terms that the guild reached with the AMPTP at the end of the strike. The agreement allowed both the Late Show with David Letterman and The Late Late Show with Craig Ferguson to return to the airwaves with their full writing staffs on January 2, 2008.

The agreement gave Worldwide Pants and CBS a perceived advantage over their rivals at NBC. The latter network was unable to make similar arrangements for its late night programming because NBC had retained control of production operations for both The Tonight Show with Jay Leno and Late Night with Conan O'Brien. Unlike CBS, NBC would have had to negotiate an agreement covering the entire network in order to have writers work on the two late night shows. NBC aired new episodes of its late night shows on the same night as CBS, but without writers. This meant, among other things, that Leno and O'Brien were unable to perform their traditional monologues without violating strike rules and were unable to secure the appearance of most celebrities, who refused to cross a picket line.

=== 2007–2015 ===
In October 2007, the media announced that Worldwide Pants would co-produce its first non-comedy project, a documentary about young adults running for public office. The documentary, titled The Youngest Candidate, was written and directed by Jason Pollock and premiered July 2008 at the Traverse City Film Festival.

In March 2008, Eco Media announced a "content partnership" with Worldwide Pants to "create original, unscripted, environment-related content, in the style of The Late Show remote segments, for television and Internet distribution."

In 2008 Worldwide Pants signed a product placement deal with Ford to promote the Ford Flex during The Late Late Show with Craig Ferguson, using a series of weekly custom-written skits in which Ferguson played the leader of a band riding in a Flex as they traveled from Los Angeles International Airport to the CBS Studio.

In April 2010, Worldwide Pants started Clear Entertainment, a.k.a. C.E. Music, a record label and announced the signing of their first band Runner Runner, a pop-punk group from Huntington Beach, California.

In April 2012, CBS announced that it would begin co-producing The Late Late Show with Worldwide Pants, part of a deal that included extending Ferguson's contract until 2014.

In October 2012, Worldwide Pants and B&B Productions—a subsidiary of Worldwide Pants created by Rob Burnett and Jon Beckerman—announced they had secured the rights to adapt Jonathan Evison's novel The Revised Fundamentals of Caregiving as a feature film.

The company's principal property, Late Show with David Letterman, wrapped up production in 2015. Its production of The Late Late Show also ended once James Corden's version of the franchise launched in March 2015, though Worldwide Pants did continue to produce the show while it was fronted by a series of guest hosts between the departure of Craig Ferguson at the end of 2014 and Corden's premiere. The company is not producing either The Late Show with Stephen Colbert or The Late Late Show with James Corden, both of which are owned outright by CBS.

=== Post-Late Show (2015–present) ===
The company didn't shut down with Letterman's retirement from late night television; however, its future direction was unclear at the time of Letterman's finale. CEO Rob Burnett said at the time of Late Show's finale: "I honestly don't know what the future of Worldwide Pants will be... We've built a brand here. There is value. Ultimately it will be to Dave to decide what he wants to do with that." Burnett indicated that he will likely step down as CEO in order to focus on his own projects once matters dealing with Late Show's winding down are concluded. The company moved out of the 13 story office building above the Ed Sullivan Theater, its home for 22 years, and relocated to Los Angeles.

In early 2017, Worldwide Pants won a lawsuit over royalties.

In an interview with New York magazine published in March 2017, Letterman said of the company: "Worldwide Pants is now on pause. Years ago, I wanted Worldwide Pants to be an ongoing organism whereby we could continue to employ people and develop material. In the meantime, things changed out from under us. It was explained to me that that production model doesn’t hold up anymore. So Worldwide Pants ran out of steam for lack of opportunity. But we are trying to put it back together. It would be fun not to be involved in traditional ABC, NBC, CBS television. There’s a billion different places to put something now."

Due to its ownership of Late Show with David Letterman and various iterations of The Late Late Show, Worldwide Pants is also the owner of a considerable library of archival footage from both programs which, according to Burnett, "is extremely valuable if handled correctly". Worldwide Pants made excerpts from Late Show and Late Night (licensed from NBC) available on YouTube in 2022, coinciding with Late Night's launch 40 years ago.

Worldwide Pants is currently the co-producer with RadicalMedia of Letterman's Netflix series My Next Guest Needs No Introduction with David Letterman.

== Productions ==
=== CBS ===
- Late Show with David Letterman (1993–2015)
- The Building (1993)
- Bonnie (1995–1996)
- The Late Late Show with Tom Snyder (1995–1999)
- Welcome to New York (2000–2001)
- Everybody Loves Raymond (1996–2005, co-produced with Where's Lunch and HBO Independent Productions)
- The Late Late Show with Craig Kilborn (1999–2004)
- The Late Late Show with Craig Ferguson (2005–2014, co-produced with CBS Television Studios 2012–2014)
- The Late Late Show (guest hosts) (January–March 2015, co-produced with CBS Television Studios)

=== ABC ===
- The Knights of Prosperity (2007, co-produced with B&B Productions and Touchstone Television)

=== HBO ===
- The High Life (1996)
- Foo Fighters: Sonic Highways (2014, co-produced with Roswell Films, Therapy Content and Diamond Docs)

=== NBC ===
- Late Night with David Letterman (1982–1993, co-produced with Carson Productions)
- Ed (2000–2004, co-produced with Viacom Productions)

=== PBS ===
- Coming Home: Military Families Cope with Change (2009, co-produced with Sesame Workshop and Lookalike Productions)
- Families Stand Together: Feeling Secure in Tough Times (2009, co-produced with Sesame Workshop and Lookalike Productions)
- Sesame Street: When Families Grieve (2010, co-produced with Sesame Workshop and Lookalike Productions)

=== Netflix ===
- The Fundamentals of Caring (2016)
- My Next Guest Needs No Introduction with David Letterman (2018–present, co-produced with RadicalMedia)
- That's My Time with David Letterman (2022)

=== TBS ===
- Stupid Pet Tricks (2024)
