= The Knights of Prosperity =

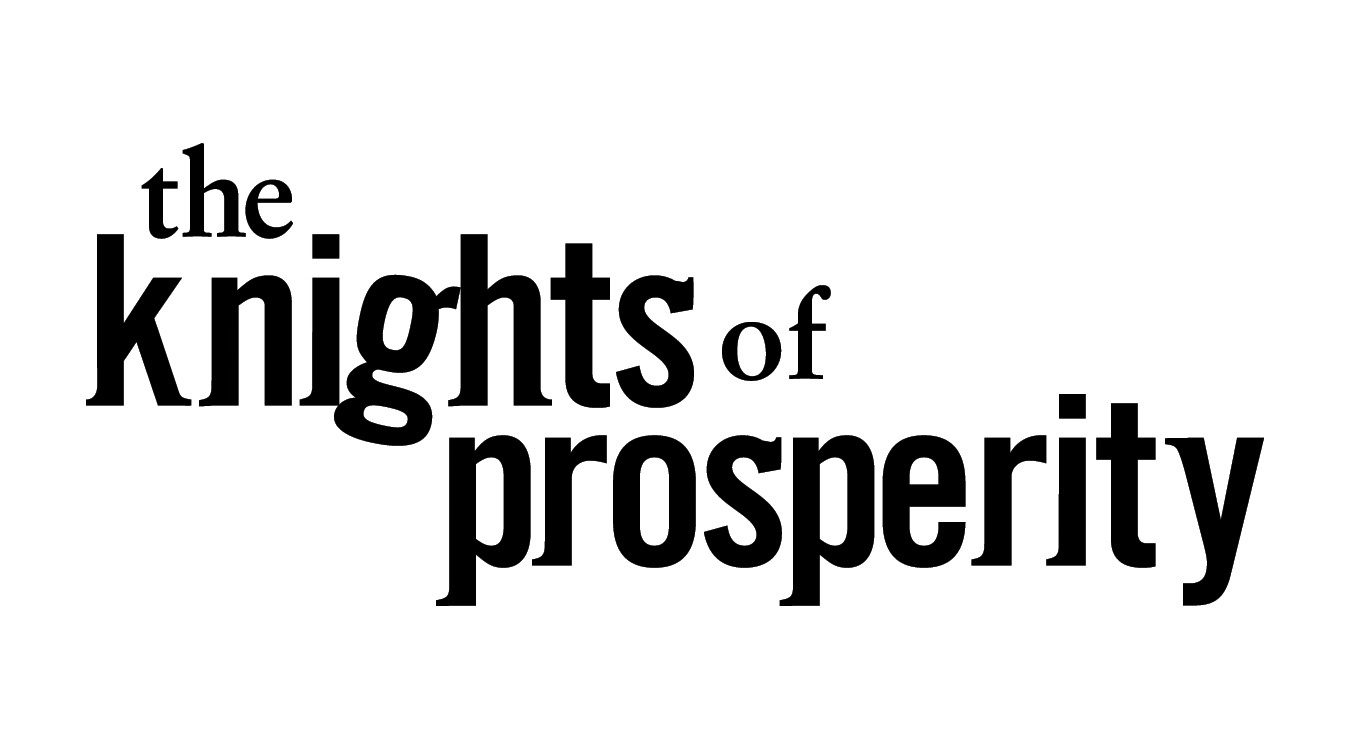
- Created by: Rob Burnett; Jon Beckerman
- Starring: Donal Logue; Sofía Vergara; Lenny Venito; Maz Jobrani; Kevin Michael Richardson; Josh Grisetti
- Opening theme: Knights of Prosperity performed by Kevin Michael Richardson
- Composer: Chris Hajian
- Country of origin: United States
- Original language: English
- No. of seasons: 1
- No. of episodes: 13 (2 unaired)

Production
- Executive producers: Rob Burnett; Jon Beckerman; David Letterman; Mick Jagger
- Camera setup: Single-camera
- Running time: 30 minutes (including commercials)
- Production companies: B&B Productions; Worldwide Pants Incorporated; Touchstone Television

Original release
- Network: ABC
- Release: January 3 – August 8, 2007

The Knights of Prosperity is an American sitcom that premiered on ABC in the United States on Wednesday, January 3, 2007. It was created by Rob Burnett and Jon Beckerman, who also created the NBC comedy-drama Ed. The show follows a group of misfits – the titular Knights – who attempt to rob various celebrities, the first being Mick Jagger (Jagger was also credited as one of the executive producers, along with the creators and David Letterman). The series was made by Letterman's Worldwide Pants Incorporated and Touchstone Television.

The series initially aired on Wednesdays at 9:00 p.m. before being moved to 8:30. The series was pulled after airing nine episodes and then officially canceled by ABC. On August 8, after 5 months off the air, ABC broadcast two episodes and then pulled the sitcom once again. On August 17, 2007, the network made all 13 episodes available for viewing on ABC.com, but they were later taken off.

== Name changes and scheduling ==
The series went through several name changes: the original title, though never publicly affirmed, was Let's Rob Jeff Goldblum, later changed to Let's Rob Mick Jagger once Goldblum committed to the NBC drama Raines. ABC announced the series for its fall schedule as Let's Rob... in May, and the final name change to Knights of Prosperity was reported in July 2006. During the TCA Tour, executive producer Rob Burnett indicated that the title might change again before the show debuts, but the show debuted under the "Knights" name.

Originally scheduled to debut on October 17, 2006, at 9:00 p.m., it was pulled from the schedule on October 3 in favor of at least two additional 90-minute episodes of its intended lead-in, Dancing with the Stars. ABC later announced that the program would be shelved and rescheduled for a January 2007 airdate due to the network now making another sitcom, Big Day, a priority for the Tuesday night schedule. On November 9, 2006, ABC began running promos for the show in advance of its January airdate. On December 5, 2006, ABC announced that the program would premiere on January 3, 2007, at 9:00 p.m. Although the show was scheduled to air the following week at 9:00, a primetime address by the President of the United States caused the second episode of the show to air at 9:30 p.m. The show returned to its normal 9:00 time slot the following week. The show was rescheduled to 8:30 beginning on January 31, 2007, and remained there until it was pulled from the schedule on March 5. Before the upfronts, the network announced that it was considering a second season featuring Ray Romano.

However, the show was ultimately canceled, and was briefly brought back in the summer to burn off the remaining episodes along with fellow low-rated newcomer The Nine. Both shows were pulled again on August 14; on August 17, ABC put up the remaining episodes on its website.

== Marketing ==
On December 26, 2006, to generate buzz for the show, ABC distributed wallets bearing the monogram "KOP" in a number of markets. The wallets contained a receipt from "Enterprise Luxury Goods Ltd." for millions of dollars in purchases, a claim check for a platinum wristwatch, and an invitation to join a promotional group via text message.

== Cast and characters ==
=== Main cast ===
- Donal Logue as Eugene Gurkin
- Sofía Vergara as Esperanza Villalobos
- Lenny Venito as Francis "Squatch" Squacieri
- Maz Jobrani as Gourishankar Subramaniam
- Kevin Michael Richardson as Rockefeller Butts
- Josh Grisetti as Louis Plunk

=== Guest stars ===
- Reiko Aylesworth as Simone Cashwell
- Ben Bailey as Ralph Carnucci
- Dustin Diamond as himself
- Mick Jagger as himself
- Sally Jessy Raphaël as herself
- Kelly Ripa as herself
- Ray Romano as himself
- Rocco DiSpirito as himself

== Episodes ==
| No. | Title | Directed by | Written by | Original release date | Viewers (millions) |
|---|---|---|---|---|---|
| 1 | "Pilot" | Rob Burnett | Jon Beckerman & Rob Burnett | January 3, 2007 | 7.20 |
| 2 | "Operation: Seduce Simone" | Don Scardino | Jon Beckerman & Rob Burnett | January 10, 2007 | 5.20 |
| 3 | "Operation: Fighting Shape" | Don Scardino | Jon Beckerman & Rob Burnett | January 17, 2007 | 3.82 |
| 4 | "Operation: Deliver the Case" | Michael Fresco | Jon Beckerman & Rob Burnett | January 24, 2007 | 3.57 |
| 5 | "Operation: Ralph" | Michael Fresco | Jon Beckerman & Rob Burnett | January 31, 2007 | 5.09 |
| 6 | "Operation: Caught on Tape" | Robert Duncan McNeill | Steve Tompkins | February 7, 2007 | 5.21 |
| 7 | "Operation: Save Esperanza" | Robert Duncan McNeill | Eric Horsted | February 14, 2007 | 4.90 |
| 8 | "Operation: Panic Room" | Don Scardino | Jon Beckerman & Rob Burnett | February 21, 2007 | 4.12 |
| 9 | "Operation: Oswald Montecristo" | Don Scardino | Jon Beckerman & Rob Burnett | February 28, 2007 | 4.11 |
| 10 | "Operation: Rent Money" | Rodman Flender | Josh Siegal & Dylan Morgan | August 8, 2007 | 2.29 |
| 11 | "Operation: Steal the Safe" | Rodman Flender | Karey Dornetto | August 8, 2007 | 2.18 |
| 12 | "Operation: Open the Safe" | Henry Winkler | Jon Beckerman & Rob Burnett | Unaired | N/A |
| 13 | "Operation: RomanoCorp" | Michael Fresco | Jon Beckerman & Rob Burnett | Unaired | N/A |

== International distribution ==
| Country | TV Network(s) | Series Premiere | Weekly schedule (local time) |
|---|---|---|---|
| Australia | Seven Network | August 2007 | The series was aired in full weekdays at 3pm. Seven repeated the series on high-definition channel Seven HD. After an initial 9.25pm Sunday time-slot, the series finished at 1am Wednesday mornings. |
| Croatia | HRT | 2008 | Sundays at 9:00 PM |
| France | Canal+ | July 2008 | Mondays to Fridays at 6:20 PM |
| Italy | Rai Due | 2008 | Saturdays at 4:10 PM |
| New Zealand | TV2 | February 2008 | Wednesday at 10:20 PM |
| Poland | Comedy Central | Fall 2007 | Mondays at 8:00 PM |
| Portugal | RTP2 | August 27, 2008 | Monday to Friday at 8:45 PM |
| Netherlands | Comedy Central | 2008 | Mondays at 10:30 PM |
| Romania | AXN | 2008 | Monday-Friday at 17:00 |
| India | Star World | 2008–2009 | Wednesday at 15:00 |

== Seasonal ratings ==
Seasonal ratings based on average total viewers per episode of Knights of Prosperity on ABC:

| Season | Timeslot (EDT) | Series Premiere | Series Finale | TV Season | Rank | Viewers (in millions) |
|---|---|---|---|---|---|---|
| 1 | Wednesday 9:00 P.M. (January 3–24, 2007) Wednesday 8:30 P.M. (January 31 - February 28, 2007) Wednesday 8:00 P.M. (August 8, 2007) | January 3, 2007 | August 8, 2007 | 2006-2007 | 107 | 5.0 (#117) |
