= The Fundamentals of Caring =

2016 American film by Rob Burnett

- Official poster
- Directed by: Rob Burnett
- Written by: Rob Burnett
- Based on: The Revised Fundamentals of Caregiving by Jonathan Evison
- Produced by: Rob Burnett; Donna Gigliotti; James Spies
- Starring: Paul Rudd; Craig Roberts; Selena Gomez
- Cinematography: Giles Nuttgens
- Edited by: Christopher Passig
- Music by: Ryan Miller
- Production companies: Worldwide Pants; Levantine Films
- Distributed by: Netflix
- Release dates: January 29, 2016 (Sundance Film Festival); June 24, 2016 (worldwide)
- Running time: 93 minutes
- Country: United States
- Language: English

The Fundamentals of Caring is a 2016 American road comedy-drama film written and directed by Rob Burnett, based on the 2012 novel The Revised Fundamentals of Caregiving by Jonathan Evison. Starring Paul Rudd, Craig Roberts, and Selena Gomez, the film had its world premiere at the Sundance Film Festival on January 29, 2016, and was released on Netflix on June 24, 2016.

== Plot ==
Ben is an out-of-work writer in Seattle, avoiding his estranged wife's attempts to serve him with divorce papers. He takes a six-week course to become a registered caregiver and is hired by Elsa, a bank office manager from England, to care for her 18-year-old son Trevor, who has Duchenne Muscular Dystrophy.

Ben adjusts to Trevor's routine and bonds with the sardonic, sexually frustrated teenager. Trevor reveals that his father left when he was diagnosed at age 3, and sends him letters which he ignores. Elsa and her son know Ben is coping with the death of his young son. She warns him not to become too close to Trevor, fearing Trevor will be hurt when Ben inevitably moves on.

Trevor is fascinated with American roadside attractions, so Ben convinces Elsa to let them take a road trip. He and Trevor embark on a journey to see the world's deepest pit. Additionally, Trevor asks to visit his father, who owns a car dealership in Salt Lake City.

At a gas station, Trevor develops a crush on a hitchhiker his age named Dot. When he and Ben see her again outside a diner, Ben invites her to join them on the road. Dot explains that she is heading to Denver to restart her life. Stopping at a motel, Ben suspects they are being followed by someone sent by his wife.

Traveling down the highway, they find pregnant Peaches, whose car has broken down, so they offer her a ride. When they stop for the night, Trevor asks Dot on a date to the diner across the street, and she accepts.

The next day, the four confront Trevor's father, Bob, at his dealership. He admits that although Elsa asked him to write to Trevor, he never did. She wrote all the letters herself. Uninterested in connecting with his son, Trevor's father offers him money instead, but he and his companions leave. Lashing out at each other, Trevor and Ben prepare to drive home, but Dot insists they complete their journey.

Arriving at the world's deepest pit, Trevor, Dot, and Peaches head to the bottom, while Ben waits at the top, saying he forgot his mobile. He confronts the driver who has been following them and discovers he is Dot's father, Cash, who wants to make sure she safely reaches Denver.

Suddenly, Ben receives a frantic call from Dot, and he races to the bottom of the pit, fearing something has happened to Trevor. He discovers Peaches has gone into labor. He helps her deliver her baby, overcoming his guilt of his son's death (his car, with the parking brake accidentally not fully engaged, ran over his son while Ben was unloading groceries).

Peaches and her newborn son are taken to the hospital. Dot reconciles with her father, who offers to take her the rest of the way to Denver. She kisses Trevor before she leaves, promising to keep in touch. With a borrowed spinal board, Ben helps Trevor fulfill his wish of urinating standing up, over the rail, into the pit.

Ben and Trevor return home, and Ben finalizes his divorce. He begins writing his next novel about Trevor, indicating he has remained close friends with him.

== Cast ==
- Paul Rudd as Ben Benjamin
- Craig Roberts as Trevor
- Selena Gomez as Dot
- Jennifer Ehle as Elsa
- Megan Ferguson as Peaches
- Frederick Weller as Bob
- Bobby Cannavale as Cash
- Julia Denton as Janet

== Production ==
On October 11, 2012, Worldwide Pants' Rob Burnett and Jon Beckerman acquired the film rights to Jonathan Evison's novel The Revised Fundamentals of Caregiving. Burnett adapted and directed the film, and Donna Gigliotti and James Spies produced. On January 7, 2015, Paul Rudd was cast to play the male lead, and on January 13, Selena Gomez also joined the film.

On December 7, it was announced that the original title, The Revised Fundamentals of Caregiving, had been changed to The Fundamentals of Caring. It was later revealed Bobby Cannavale and Frederick Weller had been cast in the film as well, with Craig Roberts also added to star opposite Rudd.

=== Filming ===
Principal photography began on January 22, 2015, in Atlanta, Georgia. In early February filming took place in Cartersville, Georgia. The shoot concluded on February 26, 2015, after 26 days of filming.

== Release ==
The film had its world premiere on January 29 at the 2016 Sundance Film Festival as the Closing Night Film. In January 2016, prior to its festival premiere, Netflix acquired the film's global distribution rights, and began streaming it on June 24, 2016.

=== Critical reception ===
On Rotten Tomatoes the film has a rating of 80%, based on 35 reviews, with an average rating of 7.7/10. The site's consensus reads: "The Fundamentals Of Caring gets maximum mileage out of the chemistry between its well-matched leads as it follows a fairly well-worn coming-of-age road trip route". On Metacritic, the film has a score of 55 out of 100, based on 10 critics, indicating "mixed or average reviews".

=== Accolades ===
Award	Date of ceremony	Category	Recipient(s)	Result	Ref.
Edinburgh International Film Festival	June 26, 2016	Best International Feature Film	Rob Burnett	Nominated	
Edinburgh International Film Festival	June 26, 2016	Audience Award	Rob Burnett	Nominated	
Georgia Film Critics Association Awards	January 13, 2017	Oglethorpe Award for Excellence in Georgia Cinema	Rob Burnett	Nominated	
Humanitas Prize	February 22, 2017	Sundance Feature Film	Rob Burnett	Nominated	
