= A Girl Named Sue =

A Girl Named Sue may refer to:

- Episode 8 (Season 2, Episode 2) of the television series F Is for Family
- Episode 126 (Season 6, Episode 12) of the television series The Flash
- Episode 156 (Season 8, Episode 7) of the television series Magnum, P.I.
