= West of Here =

2011 novel by Jonathan Evison

- Author: Jonathan Evison
- Language: English
- Genre: Fiction
- Publication date: 2011
- Publication place: United States

West of Here is a 2011 novel written by Jonathan Evison.

== Synopsis ==
Set in the mythical town of Port Bonita, Washington, with part of the narrative focused on the town's founders in 1890, and the other part set in 2006 revolving around the lives of their descendants.

== Critical reception ==
NPR wrote "The novel centers on the story of a fictional town in the Pacific Northwest, told from the perspectives of the people who first settled there and their modern-day counterparts, who now have to live with the decisions that their ancestors made."
