= This Is Your Life, Harriet Chance! =

2015 book by Jonathan Evison

First edition (publ. Algonquin Books)

This is Your Life, Harriet Chance! is a book by Jonathan Evison released in September 2015. The book is about a widow struggling to come to terms with her husband's death.
