= Jonathan Evison =

American writer

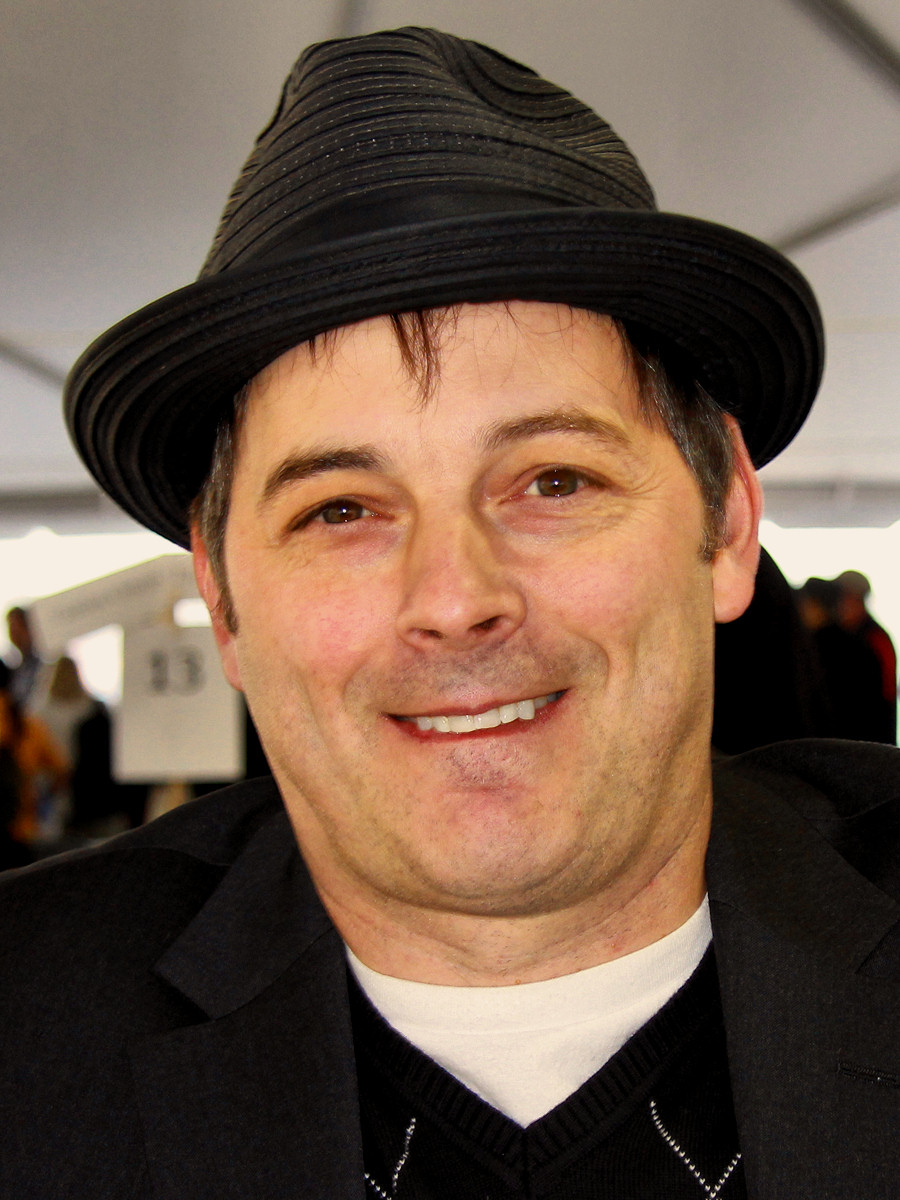
- Born: September 27, 1968 (age 58); San Jose, California, U.S.
- Occupation: Novelist
- Writing career
- Genre: Literary Fiction
- Website: jonathanevison.net

Jonathan Evison (born September 27, 1968) is an American writer known for his novels All About Lulu, West of Here, The Revised Fundamentals of Caregiving, This Is Your Life, Harriet Chance!, Lawn Boy, Legends of the North Cascades, and Small World. His work, often distinguished by its emotional resonance and offbeat humor, has been compared by critics to a variety of authors, most notably J.D. Salinger, Charles Dickens, T.C. Boyle, and John Irving. Sherman Alexie has called Evison "the most honest white man alive."

== Career ==
Evison's debut novel, All About Lulu, published in 2008 by Soft Skull Press, won critical acclaim, including the Washington State Book Award, and landed on many year-end "Best of" lists, including Hudson Booksellers, where it enjoyed the added distinction of being the only independent title selected in 2008. The L Magazine included All About Lulu in its Best Books of the Decade. Evison's second novel, the New York Times Bestselling West of Here, was released in 2011 by Algonquin Books. West of Here won the 2012 Pacific Northwest Booksellers Association Award and the Booklist Editor's Choice Award, and was named Book of the Year by Hudson Booksellers. Editor Chuck Adams has called West of Here the best novel he's worked on in over four decades of publishing.

His third novel, The Revised Fundamentals of Caregiving, released in 2012, was also widely acclaimed, earning him his second Pacific Northwest Booksellers Award in as many years. In The New York Times, Janet Maslin called the novel "Evison's most stealthily powerful" [work]. The novel was turned into the 2016 film The Fundamentals of Caring by director Rob Burnett of Worldwide Pants, starring Paul Rudd, Selena Gomez, and Craig Roberts. The film was released as a Netflix original. Evison's fourth novel, This Is Your Life, Harriet Chance! was published in fall of 2015, and soon after optioned by Focus Features, where it is currently in development. His fifth novel, Lawn Boy was published in the spring of 2018, receiving starred reviews from Publishers Weekly, Booklist, and Library Journal. The New York Times Book Review called Lawn Boy's protagonist, Mike Munoz, "a Holden Caulfield for a new millenium," and stated: "Evison's subject matter and wit is a welcome departure from self-conscious MFA trust funded prose." School Library Journal called Lawn Boy "Eminently readable and deeply thought-provoking, Evison's deceptively simple novel takes on tough issues such as race, sexual identity, and the crushing weight of American capitalism." The Washington Post said "Evison takes a battering ram to stereotypes about race and class," and called the book "an effervescent novel of hope that can enlighten everyone."

Evison's sixth novel, Legends of the North Cascades, was released in June 2021. In a starred review, Booklist called the novel "majestic and panoramic," noting that "Evison masterfully delivers a subtle yet pointed commentary on how society marginalizes veterans and how we profess to admire yet distrust the individualist ethos while also offering a profound meditation on the human spirit." The book was longlisted for the Joyce Carol Oates Prize. Small World was released in January 2022. The New York Times said of Small World: "The novel is easy to love in part because it deals in generosity and hope … Small World is ambitious, showing our interconnectedness across time, place and cultures." The Christian Science Monitor called the book "A Modern Classic." And in a starred review, Booklist called the book " A masterpiece . . . Such masterful strokes seem to qualify Small World as the quintessential Great American Novel as Evison eloquently shows that perhaps the most authentically American ideal is the ongoing, blended palette of stories."

== Life ==
Evison was born in San Jose, California, September 27, 1968, the youngest of five children. In 1976, his mother relocated the family to Bainbridge Island, Washington, when he was eight years old. He credits his third-grade teacher for making a writer out of him: "A lot of stuff, including my sister's death, and my parents' crumbling marriage, made for a rough patch around then. Also, my mania was practically off the charts. I ran my teachers ragged. My third-grade teacher, Mrs. Hanford, god love her, recognized that I liked to write, so she finally started sitting me in a corner and just letting me write, and in doing so, accomplished two things: She negated a huge distraction for the rest of the class, and she made a writer out of me." In his teens, Evison was the founding member and frontman of the Seattle punk band March of Crimes, which included future members of Pearl Jam and Soundgarden. He graduated from Bainbridge High School in 1986, before moving back to California to care for his agoraphobic grandmother. He attended community college at College of San Mateo off and on for three years, never receiving a degree. Evison allegedly wrote six unpublished novels before the publication of All About Lulu, physically burying three of them, and purportedly burning all of his rejection letters.,

Evison is renowned for his extensive and colorful book touring, and his love of beer. In 2009 and 2011 he was nominated by the American Book Association as Most Engaging Author.

== Controversy ==
On September 9, 2021, at a school board meeting in Leander, Texas, a parent protested the inclusion of Evison's Lawn Boy, along with Maia Kobabe's Gender Queer in the Leander School District Library System. The parent described the books as "depraved" and likened their content to pedophilia. Both Lawn Boy and Gender Queer were pulled from shelves in Leander, Texas and a police investigation ensued. On September 24, 2021, a similar incident occurred in the Fairfax School District in Fairfax, Virginia, where, again, both books were pulled from the shelves pending an independent review. Republican gubernatorial candidate Glenn Youngkin cited Lawn Boy and Gender Queer in a political advertisement claiming that they were "books that included pedophilia." Soon after the books were removed from school libraries, over four hundred students in Fairfax protested the removal of the books.

In a statement in The Washington Post, Evison claimed that he had received numerous death threats, and many instances of harassment as a result of the controversy. He said, "contrary to allegations circulating online, the book does not describe or contain pedophilia. The scene people seem to be upset about involves an adult man recalling a sexual encounter he had with another fourth-grader when he was in fourth grade. If I had a statement, it would be: 'Read the book or sit down.'"

== Works ==
=== Novels ===
- All About Lulu (2008) (Soft Skull Press)
- West of Here (2011) (Algonquin Books)
- The Revised Fundamentals of Caregiving (2012) (Algonquin Books)
- This Is Your Life, Harriet Chance! (2015) (Algonquin Books)
- Lawn Boy (2018) (Algonquin Books)
- Legends of the North Cascades (2021) (Algonquin Books)
- Small World: A Novel (2022) (Dutton)
- Again and Again (2023) (Dutton)
- The Heart of Winter (2025) (Dutton)

== Awards and honors ==
All About Lulu

- 2008 Hudson Booksellers Best Books of the Year
- 2009 Washington State Book Award
- 2009 Richard Buckley Fellowship from the Christopher Isherwood Foundation
- The El Magazine Best Books of the Decade
- Time Out Chicago Best Books of the Year

West of Here

- New York Times Bestseller
- 2012 Pacific Northwest Booksellers Award
- 2012 Hudson Booksellers Best Books of the Year
- September 2012 Indie Next Pick
- Publishers Weekly "BEA Galley to Grab" and "Top Ten: Literary Fiction" pick
- 2012 Booklist Editors Choice Award

The Revised Fundamentals of Caregiving

- New York Times Editors Choice
- 2012 Pacific Northwest Booksellers Award
- 2012 Hudson Booksellers Best Books of the Year
- September 2012 Indie Next pick
- Publishers Weekly "Top Ten: Literary Fiction" pick

This is Your Life, Harriet Chance!

- 2015 Chicago Library Best of the Best Book List
- 2015 Pacific Northwest Bookseller Award (finalist)

Lawn Boy

- Alex Award - Young Adult Library Services Association

Other

- 2009, 2011 & 2012 American Booksellers Association "Most Engaging Author" (Nominee)
- 2013 Above and Beyond Award, Honoring Literary Citizenship (Nominee)
