= Manhattan, AZ =

Summer 2000 television comedy

- Created by: David Richardson
- Starring: Brian McNamara; Vincent Berry; Chad Everett
- Composer: Kenneth Mazur
- Country of origin: United States
- Original language: English
- No. of seasons: 1
- No. of episodes: 13 (5 unaired)

Production
- Executive producers: David Richardson; Bill Freiberger; David Silverman; Stephen Sustarsic
- Running time: 22 minutes
- Production companies: Bats Left Throws Left Productions; Stu Segall Productions; USA Cable Entertainment

Original release
- Network: USA Network
- Release: July 23 – September 24, 2000

Manhattan, AZ is a comedy television show that aired on the USA Network in 2000.

== Premise ==
An undercover Los Angeles Vice Cop, Daniel Henderson, loses his loving wife in a bizarre sea accident. While working for Greenpeace cutting dolphins out of tuna nets, she is herself swept up and canned in spring light water. In his despair he decides to move to Manhattan, AZ along with his son, to become sheriff and start a new life. Daniel likes the peace and quiet the desert has to offer while Atticus hates its small town ways. Described by critics as "Andy Griffith on acid," Manhattan, AZ is composed of many colorful characters and Area 61, an eerie Air Force base that officially doesn't exist and is the cause of many mysterious events nearby. The situations seem over the top but are cut from the headlines of the day. The humorous dialogue is delivered deadpan. The episodes end with one of the actors speaking directly to the audience describing something in the episode with the end line of "We work in television and we know better than you."

== Cast ==
=== Main ===
- Brian McNamara as Sheriff Daniel Henderson - Sheriff of very small Manhattan, AZ desert town. Former undercover Los Angeles vice cop. Former soldier in US Army in Panama.
- Vincent Berry as Atticus Finch Henderson - Son of Sheriff Daniel Henderson. Named after character from "To Kill A Mocking Bird". Episodes end with his voiceover that says "This Place Really Sucks".
  - Atticus is portrayed by Chace Paddack during the first half of the episodes
- Chad Everett as Jake Manhattan - Mayor of his namesake town where he runs the town bar. He charges "His cost plus ten percent" for everything. He is a former Hollywood TV star.

=== Recurring ===
- Mindy Sterling as Lona, wife of Lon, a pair of sex crazed, gun toting senior citizens
- Robin Gammell as Lon, husband of Lona
- Kate Hodge as Jane Pentowski - An Air Force airmen who likes Sheriff Henderson and wears very skimpy outfits while off duty.
- Stephen Tobolowsky as Dr. Bob - The town vet that doubles as the towns medical Doctor.

== Episodes ==
No.	Title	Directed by	Written by	Original release date
1	"Brown Parcels of Land"	Boris Damast	David Richardson	July 23, 2000
2	"Manhattan Cactus Serial Murders"	Boris Damast	David Richardson	July 30, 2000
3	"The Indian War"	Boris Damast	David Silverman & Stephen Sustarsic	August 6, 2000
4	"The Dawged Deputy"	Tony Dow	Bill Canterbury	August 13, 2000
5	"Cattle Drive"	Boris Damast	Joe Port & Joe Wiseman	August 20, 2000
6	"Jake's Daughter"	Tom Gianas	Bill Freiberger	August 27, 2000
7	"Bees Story"	Max Tash	Mike Lisbe & Nate Reger	September 17, 2000
8	"Jake's Zoo"	Sanford Bookstaver	Mike Lisbe & Nate Reger	September 24, 2000
9	"Lt. Colonel's Boy"	Tony Dow	Al Aidekman	Unaired
10	"Cool Hand Jake"	Michael Grossman	Joe Port & Joe Wiseman	Unaired
11	"What Makes Atticus Run?"	Tony Dow	Joe Port & Joe Wiseman	Unaired
12	"Atticus Doesn't Live Here Anymore"	Michael Grossman	Mike Lisbe & Nate Reger	Unaired
13	"The Voyage Home"	Michael Grossman	Joe Port & Joe Wiseman	Unaired
