= Judith Lynne Hanna =

American anthropologist (born 1936)

- Born: 1936 (age 89–90)
- Education: University of California, Los Angeles (BA); Michigan State University (MA); Columbia University (PhD)
- Occupations: Anthropologist; scholar; author
- Website: judithhanna.com

Judith Lynne Hanna (born 1936) is an American anthropologist, scholar, and author. She is an affiliate research professor in the Department of Anthropology at the University of Maryland, College Park. Her research focuses on the relationship between dance and society in African villages and in social settings in America, such as schools and entertainment clubs. She has also conducted research on African cities, urban studies, and at-risk youth. She is the grandmother of YouTuber Merrick Hanna.

== Education and career ==
She earned a Ph.D. in anthropology from Columbia University in 1976, an M.A. in political science from Michigan State University and a B.A. in political science from UCLA. Her field research with her husband, William John Hanna, in Kenya, Nigeria, and Uganda in 1963, funded by a Michigan State University-Ford Foundation grant, resulted in the publication of her 1979 book To Dance is Human.

Hanna earned a California Teaching Credential and was a social studies and English teacher at a Los Angeles City School.

Hanna has researched various forms of dance, including in villages and cities in Africa, in American theaters and playgrounds, and in adult entertainment clubs and neo-burlesque venues in the United States.

She has served as an expert witness on over 150 court cases involving exotic dance since 1995, and her views on exotic dance have been sought by The Colbert Report and Bloomberg News. The Michelle Smith Library for the Performing Arts at the University of Maryland holds a collection of her work.

In 2018, Hanna participated in her first music video with the rock band, Egg Drop Soup.

== Selected publications ==
- Dancing to Learn: The Brain's Cognition, Emotion, and Movement" (Rowman and Littlefield, 2015)
- Naked Truth: Strip Clubs, Democracy, and a Christian Right (University of Texas Press, 2012)
- To Dance Is Human: A Theory of Nonverbal Communication (University of Chicago Press)
- Dance, Sex and Gender: Signs of Identity, Dominance and Desire (University of Chicago Press)
- The Performer-Audience Connection: Emotion to Metaphor in Dance and Society (University of Texas Press)
- Dancing for Health: Conquering and Preventing Stress (AltaMira Press)
- Disruptive School Behavior: Class, Race, and Culture (Holmes & Meier)
