= Al Ducharme =

American stand-up comedian

Al Ducharme is an American stand-up comedian. Ducharme is known for voicing the character Anthony on Bill Burr's animated F Is for Family on Netflix and for America's Got Talent. Ducharme was the original host of Mission: Organization on HGTV.

== Personal life ==
Ducharme married comedian Bernadette Pauley in 2004.
