= List of F Is for Family episodes =

The following is a list of episodes from the Netflix adult animated series F Is for Family. During the course of the series, 44 episodes of F Is for Family were released over five seasons.

== Series overview ==
Season	Episodes	Originally released
1	6	December 18, 2015
2	10	May 30, 2017
3	10	November 30, 2018
4	10	June 12, 2020
5	8	November 25, 2021

== Episodes ==
=== Season 1 (2015) ===
No. overall	No. in season	Title	Directed by	Written by	Original release date	Prod. code
1	1	"The Bleedin' in Sweden"	Benjamin Marsaud	Story by : Bill Burr and Michael Price; Teleplay by : Michael Price	December 18, 2015	101
In 1973, Frank is excited at the prospect of having the entire neighborhood over to watch an upcoming boxing match, but when Vic unintentionally threatens to ruin Frank's chances with his much more expensive and exciting television set, Frank overpromises that he has an even bigger color TV to convince the neighbors to come to his house instead. After he purchases one, Bill accidentally messes it up when he sticks a magnet on it as part of a school project. Frank initially believes that the store sold him a lemon and has an outburst in front of all the employees and customers when they refuse to give him a refund, embarrassing Sue. Bill eventually confesses, but after being gloated over by one of the store's employees when Frank and Sue take him to apologize, Bill uses his magnet to ruin every single television set in the store, and Frank gets refunded. At the end of the episode, the neighbors watch the match at Frank's house, while Vic watches it at his house "alone". Featured music: "At Last" by Etta Jones
2	2	"Saturday Bloody Saturday"	Laurent Nicolas	David Richardson	December 18, 2015	102
After finding out that Kevin is failing nearly every single one of his classes, Frank takes him to his job at the airport, where he's recently been promoted after his former boss was decapitated in a violent work accident, to demonstrate to him the responsibilities of caring for a family. Frank is torn between his underpaid, hard-working co-workers who are contemplating a strike, and his employer, who worries a strike will shut down Mohican Airways for good. Although Kevin is initially unimpressed and spends most of the day hanging around with some pill-popping, underachieving airport staff, he realizes the difficulties of his father's job after he witnesses Frank being yelled at and insulted by an old woman, who accuses the airport of stealing her medication, and comes to appreciate how hard Frank works to put food on the table. Meanwhile, after his father puts him in charge of Maureen for the day, Bill struggles to keep her rebellious nature under wraps, while Sue begins to doubt her solitary role as a mother and wife. Featured music: "I'll Be Your Mirror by The Velvet Underground" and Nico, "The Court of the Crimson King" by Steve Hackett
3	3	"The Trough"	Benjamin Marsaud	Michael Price	December 18, 2015	103
Despite Kevin's promises to get back on track to improve his grades, Frank is outraged when he finds out that Kevin is still falling behind, and as a punishment, takes Bill to a football game where he was given corporate seats by the management at Mohican Airways, which Frank had initially promised Kevin to go to. While there, they meet Rodger Dunbarton, CEO at Mohican Airways, who speaks to Frank about talks of a strike and how he must no longer sympathize with his co-workers. On the drive home, their car breaks down, and they are helped by Rosie, one of Frank's co-workers, but when Bill innocently reveals they had been given tickets to a football game and his father's conversation with Dunbarton, Frank faces a hostile situation at work. Meanwhile, Sue goes to the mall with Maureen, where she is accosted by a talkative friend, and Maureen learns of her mother's underwhelming home life during a surprise outburst. Kevin hangs out with friends and gets high, reminiscing of the loving relationship he and his father had when he was young.
4	4	"'F' is for Halloween"	Laurent Nicolas	Tom Gianas	December 18, 2015	104
On Halloween, Frank attempts to dissuade Sue from a promotion, leading to tensions between them; Bill is reluctant to trick-or-treat because he's been threatened by school bully Jimmy Fitzsimmons.
5	5	"Bill Murphy's Day Off"	Benjamin Marsaud	Emily Towers	December 18, 2015	105
Bill tries to hide his recent suspension while Frank earns the ire of his co-workers for befriending the aloof CEO of the airline. In addition, Frank struggles to make good on a promise to Kevin. Featured music: "Here Comes That Rainy Day Feeling Again" by The Fortunes
6	6	"O Holy Moly Night"	Laurent Nicolas	David Richardson	December 18, 2015	106
When Christmas comes near, Frank is desperate to remedy the hostility of his co-workers and his supervisors at the airport while the family dog is missing. Kevin starts his part-time job selling Christmas trees. Bill becomes an altar boy at the church and gets into trouble. Featured music: "Deck the Halls", "O Holy Night" by Carrie Underwood, "Here Comes That Rainy Day Feeling Again" by The Fortunes

=== Season 2 (2017) ===
No. overall	No. in season	Title	Directed by	Written by	Original release date	Prod. code
7	1	"Heavy Sledding"	Romain Bounoure & Olivier Schramm	Michael Price	May 30, 2017	201
In 1974, three weeks after he got fired, Frank is still unemployed. On a snow day, Sue decides to take the family sledding to get them out of their slump. Featured music: "Memories Are Made of This" by Jim Reeves
8	2	"A Girl Named Sue"	Romain Bounoure & Olivier Schramm	David Richardson	May 30, 2017	202
Frank's old boss, Bob Pogo, calls him to offer him a job, only for things to turn out bad for Frank. Meanwhile, Sue ponders a change in her life. Featured music: "I'll Come When You Call" by Ruby Murray, "I Am Woman" by Helen Reddy
9	3	"The Liar's Club"	Romain Bounoure & Olivier Schramm	Bill Burr	May 30, 2017	203
After bailing out of the unemployment office, Frank turns to Rosie's friend, Smokey, for a job, but not before helping Kevin move into the basement after he ditches school. Meanwhile, Sue gets a new job as a secretary, but is mistreated by the sexist heads of her company.
10	4	"Night Shift"	Romain Bounoure & Olivier Schramm	Emily Towers	May 30, 2017	204
Frank gets a job as a stocking man courtesy of Smokey, consequently sleeping through the day and ignoring Sue and his family. All the while, Kevin and his band try to get a gig and Sue has an idea for a new Plast-a-Ware product. Featured music: "A Natural Man" by Lou Rawls
11	5	"Breaking Bill"	Romain Bounoure & Olivier Schramm	Joe Heslinga	May 30, 2017	205
After Frank learns that Kevin and his band are performing on a school night, his attempts at halting it cause intense tension between him and Kevin. Meanwhile, Bill, having received money from his job as a paperboy, tries to buy a hockey-stick for hockey tryouts, but a run-in with the local bully, Jimmy, pushes him over the edge. Also, when Sue pitches her idea, she still receives a lack of respect.
12	6	"This is Not Good"	Romain Bounoure, Olivier Schramm & Mike Roberts	Henry Gammill	May 30, 2017	206
When Frank's new job includes a stop at the airport, he ends up in a predicament with Bob, who tearfully expresses his angst towards the Dunbartons and how it is stressing him out, and how he is now dealing with kidney stones and high blood pressure due to his diet. Kevin tries to get a date with a 'haircut' girl, but due to erection problems, he bails and this attracts the attention of Vic's new girlfriend. Also, Bill begins to enjoy lifting his legs on the law, much to the concern of his friend Phillip.
13	7	"Fight Night"	Romain Bounoure, Olivier Schramm & Mike Roberts	Eric Goldberg & Peter Tibbals	May 30, 2017	207
Frank and Sue's individual underhanded actions causes them to have a major fight on their anniversary when they're called into a meeting with Maureen's school teacher.
14	8	"F is for Fixing It"	Romain Bounoure, Olivier Schramm & Mike Roberts	Valeri Vaughn	May 30, 2017	208
Frank and Sue try to deal with their marital problems; Kevin feels guilty for having sex with Vic's new girlfriend; and when Jimmy tried to make amends after he has been released from Catholic Military School, a fearful revelation from Phillip reveals Bill's part in sending him away, causing Jimmy to go back to his bullying ways.
15	9	"Pray Away"	Romain Bounoure, Olivier Schramm & Mike Roberts	Marc Wilmore	May 30, 2017	209
Frank and Sue go to a couple's retreat to get help from a priest when their marriage begins to hit a snag, which only leads to a moment of truth between them. Meanwhile, Bill and his friends try to deal with a vengeful Jimmy, while Kevin is forced to deal with Vic when the latter finds out about his girlfriend's affair with Kevin.
16	10	"Landing the Plane"	Romain Bounoure & Olivier Schramm	Michael Price	May 30, 2017	210
The day takes a traumatic turn for the Murphys when the founder of Plast-a-Wares takes credit for Sue's idea and Frank and his friends attempt to get rid of "Scoop," the mentally unstable new manager (Roger Dunbarton's nephew), which inadvertently causes them to be caught in the middle of a terrorist attack caused by a Black Panthers-esque band of domestic terrorists.

=== Season 3 (2018) ===
No. overall	No. in season	Title	Directed by	Written by	Original release date	Prod. code
17	1	"Are You Ready for the Summer?"	Olivier Schramm	Eric Goldberg & Peter Tibbals	November 30, 2018	301
With summer around the corner and Sue being pregnant with a 4th child, the Murphys head to town to watch the annual Memorial Day Parade, where each of them faces a certain problem.
18	2	"Paul Lynde to Block"	Sylvain Lavoie	David Richardson	November 30, 2018	302
Frank befriends his new neighbor, Chet Stevenson, whom he invites, along with his Vietnamese wife Nguyen-Nguyen, to the drive-in theater with his family, much to Sue's chagrin since she wanted the chance to spend time with Frank alone.
19	3	"The Stinger"	Olivier Schramm	Marc Wilmore	November 30, 2018	303
Sue's new invention The Forkoontula, a Swiss army knife-esque kitchen utensil, stirs up problems with her support group of the neighbor's wives. Kevin attends summer school due to failing math. Bill and Phillip go to the city pool, where a chance to be with Bill's crush, Bridget Fitzsimmons, eventually leads to an embarrassing erection incident at a local pool. Frank receives two promotions at work, one of which was his old position and the other was a position that his friend Rosie was next in line for, making the latter utterly upset and prompting Frank to try and mend fences between him and Bob Pogo.
20	4	"Mr. Murphy's Wild Ride"	Sylvain Lavoie	Michael Price	November 30, 2018	304
Frank, Chet, Vic, and the rest of the husband neighbors begin to work on the baby's new room and soon, Chet takes Frank on a joyride in a jet while Bill and Phillip's friendship is put to the test when the latter gets jealous of Bill's crush on Bridget.
21	5	"Battle of the Sexes"	Olivier Schramm	Emily Towers	November 30, 2018	305
Sue hosts another depressing focus group for her invention. Frank is scared Chet might want to hang out with Vic. Bill and Bridget sneak out after dark and wander around the town as a 'first date'. Sue discovers that Chet treats Nguyen-Nguyen very abusively. Featured music: "Frankenstein" by The Edgar Winter Group
22	6	"Punch Drunk"	Sylvain Lavoie	Joe Heslinga	November 30, 2018	306
Sue tries to warn Frank after discovering Chet treats Nguyen-Nguyen horribly, which puts Frank in an awkward position at a 4th of July neighborhood barbecue.
23	7	"Summer Vacation"	Olivier Schramm	Valeri Vaughn	November 30, 2018	307
The Murphy's have a disastrous vacation at a lakeside including but not limited to staying in a rundown cabin, the visit from Sue's condescending parents, and Kevin trying to face his childhood trauma of almost drowning in a swimming pool at a hotel nearby.
24	8	"It's In His Blood"	Sylvain Lavoie	Henry Gammill	November 30, 2018	308
Frank sees Chet's dark side after the latter rats him out for constructing the new baby's room without a permit, even though Chet built it while the Murphy's were away on vacation and it's affecting his friendship on his neighbors. Maureen and Phillip train to be on a game show Phillip and his younger brother Anthony enjoy. Bridget 'dumps' Bill but treats him like he dumped her, much to Bill's frustration. Kevin discovered that his band replaced him after he quit as guitarist, leading to him to do a humiliating task in order to get back in. A dedication ceremony at Frank's job ends up being the height of Frank's disgust for Chet when he gets hired to become head of the pilot training program. Chet is poisoned by his wife Nguyen-Nguyen after she realizes Chet won't change his abusive ways.
25	9	"Frank the Father"	Olivier Schramm	Bill Burr	November 30, 2018	309
Frank visits Chet in the hospital after he was poisoned by his wife Nguyen-Nguyen and then tries a new parenting practice after getting Kevin out of jail. Maureen attempts to win the game show, but the corrupt show producers aren't having it. Bill makes a life-changing decision.
26	10	"Bill Murphy's Night Off"	Sylvain Lavoie	Michael Price	November 30, 2018	310
Bill tries to run away with Bridget to Pittsburgh, but Bridget bails and Bill soon escapes the train and faces one mishap after another trying to find a way back home while his family and friends band together to find him.

=== Season 4 (2020) ===
No. overall	No. in season	Title	Directed by	Written by	Original release date	Prod. code
27	1	"Father Confessor"	Sylvain Lavoie	Michael Price	June 12, 2020	401
Frank confides his issues regarding his reunion with his estranged father, Big Bill Murphy, to Father Pat.
28	2	"Nothing is Impossible"	Sylvain Lavoie	Henry Gammill	June 12, 2020	402
On back-to-school night, Frank goes to the Grade School for Bill and Maureen but his poor memories with his dad get in the way. Sue goes to the High School for Kevin and attempts to get him in a college program.
29	3	"Bring Me A Tooth"	Sylvain Lavoie	David Richardson	June 12, 2020	403
Wanting to prove himself as a superior parent to Big Bill, Frank attempts to help his kids in their extracurricular activities, but fails miserably. When Vic gets rehired at the radio station, he is hit with a surprise.
30	4	"The B Word"	Sylvain Lavoie	Valeri Vaughn	June 12, 2020	404
Bill sees his grandpa’s true colors when Big Bill tries to take him to a hockey game. Frank struggles to bond with his father-in-law Stan, who is visiting. Sue goes to a baby shower where her mother Marilyn, who is also visiting, is in attendance. Maureen bonds with Bridget Fitzsimmons.
31	5	"Just Breathe"	Sylvain Lavoie	Joe Heslinga	June 12, 2020	405
Following a car crash in the last episode, Sue must spend the night at a hospital and she can’t reach Frank because he and Big Bill must attend to the new X-ray machine at the airport. Also, Bill gains a violent reputation at his first hockey game.
32	6	"Come to Papa"	Sylvain Lavoie	Jessica Lee Williamson	June 12, 2020	406
Franks tells his father about how his attempts to be a better dad and husband have backfired regarding Maureen’s small role in a play being regressed to a stagehand, Bill’s violent behavior when doing hockey, Kevin’s new girlfriend Alice, and Sue taking a Lamaze class to help with her pregnancy.
33	7	"R is For Rosie"	Sylvain Lavoie	Joe Piarulli & Luan Thomas	June 12, 2020	407
The episode focuses on Rosie and how he comes to realize that his role as the new Alderman is not what he thought it was. Rosie’s daughter, Mina, auditions for a part in a show.
34	8	"Murphy & Son"	Sylvain Lavoie	Bill Burr	June 12, 2020	408
Frank and Big Bill’s relationship seems to be improving, but when the family goes to see Maureen’s play, things take a turn for the worse when Frank punches Big Bill after he once again denies to admit his abusive actions against Frank. Vic tries to write a new song for his company.
35	9	"Land Ho!"	Sylvain Lavoie	Sam Stefanak	June 12, 2020	409
Frank, Bob, Rosie, and Red take a business trip to Cleveland, Ohio in order to be trained to handle the airport X-ray machine, but after his colleagues goof-off, Frank soon discovers that Mohican Airways is being sold to a competing airport. Vic gets Kevin and his band a gig at the upcoming Kweezetoberfest, but with a new makeover and new name.
36	10	"Baby, Baby, Baby"	Sylvain Lavoie	Marc Wilmore	June 12, 2020	410
After Sue goes into labor, Frank and his friends attempt to make it back home and he not only tries to make it to the delivery, but also to make amends with his father once and for all. At the hospital Bill and Maureen confront Big Bill for the mean-spirited villain he is at the play by making Frank mad and telling him to punch him, this finally makes Big Bill see he messed up Frank. Sue gives birth a baby girl, but when Frank takes her to see Big Bill, he suddenly passes out.

=== Season 5 (2021) ===
No. overall	No. in season	Title	Directed by	Written by	Original release date	Prod. code
37	1	"The Mahogany Fortress"	Sylvain Lavoie	Michael Price	November 25, 2021	501
The Murphys attend Big Bill's funeral where Frank struggles to deal with his emotions, Bill hangs out with Jimmy, and Maureen watches an undertaker dismember a dead body. Featured music: "My Dad" by Paul Petersen
38	2	"The Rustvale Massacre"	Sylvain Lavoie	Henry Gammill	November 25, 2021	502
Sue attempts to convince her father Stan to come to her house for Thanksgiving, with the added bonus of her estranged queer brother Louis. Frank meets his new employers at the airport after it was sold to the competing airline Aliquippa. Bill and his friends cause trouble at a school field trip with Maureen and Bridget making their own mischief. Kevin meets his new girlfriend, Alice's family.
39	3	"Blind Alley"	Sylvain Lavoie	Valeri Vaughn	November 25, 2021	503
Sue tries to persuade Louis to attend Thanksgiving and reunite with their parents. After getting arrested last episode, Bill, Jimmy and Phillip must attend "Scared Straight" programs on Saturdays. Kevin gets clingy with Alice while at a concert after hearing about her ex-boyfriend Joel. Frank finds what he assumes to be "Box 16" (the dying words of his father) and calls his mom Nora for more information. Rosie pushes his luck with Mayor Tangenti.
40	4	"Thank You So Much"	Sylvain Lavoie	Joe Heslinga	November 25, 2021	504
On Thanksgiving, Frank and Sue concoct an elaborate series of lies in order to keep Louis and Stan from fighting. Vic struggles to raise his infant son and asks Goomer and Evelyn for help, but gets more than what he bargained for. Pogo opens up a chicken-skin themed restaurant, which proves to be an utter failure and a sudden fire puts him in hot water with the mob. Kevin's attempt to make amends with Alice goes horribly wrong as he ends up punching her brother for thinking he is her ex-boyfriend, fed up with Kevin's crazy immaturity Alice breaks up with him.
41	5	"The Searchers"	Sylvain Lavoie	David Richardson	November 25, 2021	505
When Frank finds a key with the number 16 on it, he goes above and beyond trying to find "Box 16" in order to find out what Big Bill was trying to tell him before his demise. Kevin tries to convert to Judaism in order for Alice to take him back since she's Jewish, but fails miserably. Sue attends a party at Vic's house to calm her nerves. Maureen's newfound interest in the occult is taken too far. Carl and Red, having resigned from the airport earlier in the season, try to make it big as porn film directors. Bill, Phillip and Jimmy become crooked junior cops.: This episode was dedicated to writer David Richardson.
42	6	"Screw Ups"	Sylvain Lavoie	Sam Stefanak; Jessica Lee Williamson	November 25, 2021	506
Following the events of their offspring's recent misconducts, Sue takes Maureen to Father Patt to end her occult obsession, Frank's attempt to give Bill "the talk" soon results in Bill confessing to him witnessing Frank and Sue having intercourse in "Bill Murphy's Day Off" from the first season and Kevin is taken by Smokey for the day to get over his break-up with Alice.: This episode was dedicated to Michael K. Williams voice of Smokey.
43	7	"A Very Merry F***ing Christmas"	Sylvain Lavoie	Eric Goldberg & Peter Tibbals	November 25, 2021	507
Frank thinks he's finally located "Box 16", which was filled with a bunch of recordings Big Bill made, he soon gets inspired by them to propose a money-making stunt for the higher-ups at his job. Frank's mother Nora and sister Eileen come to visit for Christmas. Sue and Louis make amends and uses his karate dojo to start a new business. Mayor Tangenti tries to bulldoze Rosie's neighborhood to make way for a new High-Way in retaliation for his assertion.: This episode was dedicated to writer and producer Marc Wilmore.
44	8	"Bye Bye, Frankie"	Sylvain Lavoie	Bill Burr	November 25, 2021	508
On Christmas Day, after the stunt to improve business at the airport backfires, Frank is down in the dumps but soon finds a sense of closure after discovering what Big Bill really meant by "Box 16" after talking to one of his father's old friends. Rosie manages to get one over on the Mayor with Pogo's help. Featured music: "Surrender" by Cheap Trick
