= Lawn Boy (Evison novel) =

2018 novel by Jonathan Evison

- Author: Jonathan Evison
- Language: English
- Genre: Bildungsroman; Semi-autobiographical
- Publisher: Algonquin Books
- Publication date: April 3, 2018
- Publication place: United States
- Pages: 320
- ISBN: 978-1-61620-262-0

Lawn Boy is a semi-autobiographical coming-of-age novel written by Jonathan Evison and published in 2018 by Algonquin Books. It tells the story of Mike Muñoz, a young adult Mexican American who has faced hardship ever since his childhood and is now going through a phase of self-discovery.

== Reception ==
Lawn Boy's narrative was praised by Kirkus Reviews, who said "[t]he first-person narration turns Mike into a living, breathing person, and the reader can't help but get pulled into his worldview." The writer also commented on Jonathan Evison's use of humor in the book, saying he "brings genuine humor to Mike's trials and tribulations", but noted a negative tone the protagonist has too many issues in his life.

Carol Memmott, reviewing for The Washington Post, says "Evison takes a battering ram to stereotypes about race and class" in Lawn Boy. Memmott also comments on how the novel deals with racism in the United States, citing a section of the book to exemplify how Muñoz is "constantly reminded of what it means to be brown in America." She concludes the review by saying that "Evison has written an effervescent novel of hope that can enlighten everyone."

The book received a starred review by the Library Journal, which stated "Evison combines humor, honesty, and anger with an insightful commentary on class that's also an effective coming-of-age novel." Writing for the School Library Journal, Mark Flowers called it a "readable and deeply thought-provoking" novel, and noted some of the themes explored in the book, such as "race, sexual identity, and the crushing weight of American capitalism". Flowers also commented on how "Evison's often infective enthusiasm for his preponderance of ideas weighs down the demands of the plot."

Lawn Boy was one of American Library Association's Alex Awards recipients of 2019, "for the ten best adult books that appeal to teen audiences".

== Controversy and censorship ==
Lawn Boy has regularly been the target of controversy and censorship in the United States. In 2022, the American Library Association reported it was the seventh-most-banned and challenged book in the country due to its inclusion of LGBT+ content and being sexually explicit.

On September 9, 2021, during a board meeting of the Leander Independent School District in Texas, the mother of a student raised concerns about the content present in Lawn Boy, saying "the book was full of obscenity and sexual content". Three people filed reports with the local police after the meeting. A spokesperson for the school district said the book was not present in any curriculum, but was available in some classroom libraries for checkout.

Later in the month, on a meeting of the Fairfax County Public Schools in Virginia, two other speakers, spurred by the Texas challenge, denounced Evison's book, alongside Maia Kobabe's Gender Queer: A Memoir, "for sexually explicit language, scenes and imagery including what one speaker called 'homoerotic' content". A third speaker also "seemed to critique the books for their LGBTQ story lines and themes". In response, officials said the books would be removed from libraries and two committees would be created to assess if the books are appropriate for high school students. According to a Fairfax board member, several members of the board "have received messages promising physical violence or even death over their perceived support of the books".

Some of the passages in the book were observed to be depictions of pedophilia by the parents who spoke at the meetings in both Texas and Virginia. Evison, responding to the allegations, explained that the scene in the book "involves an adult man recalling a sexual encounter he had with another fourth-grader when he was in fourth grade". Evison said that after news began spreading about the challenge at the Texas school district, he started to receive death threats.

In November 2021, Fairfax County Public Schools decided to return the two books to its high school libraries following a committee review.

In December 2021 Wake County (N.C.) Public Libraries responded to a patron complaint about Lawn Boy and Gender Queer. They let Lawn Boy remain on shelves but removed Gender Queer.

In January 2022 Wayzata (Minn.) Public Schools removed the book through informal resolution.

In 2022, Lawn Boy was listed among 52 books banned by the Alpine School District following the implementation of Utah law H.B. 374, "Sensitive Materials In Schools". Forty-two percent of removed books "feature LBGTQ+ characters and or themes". Many of the books were removed because they contain pornographic material according to the new law, which defines pornography using the following criteria:

- "The average person" would find that the material, on the whole, "appeals to prurient interest in sex";
- The material "is patently offensive in the description or depiction of nudity, sexual conduct, sexual excitement, sadomasochistic abuse, or excretion";
- The material, on the whole, "does not have serious literary, artistic, political or scientific value".
