= F Is for Family =

Adult animated web comedy series

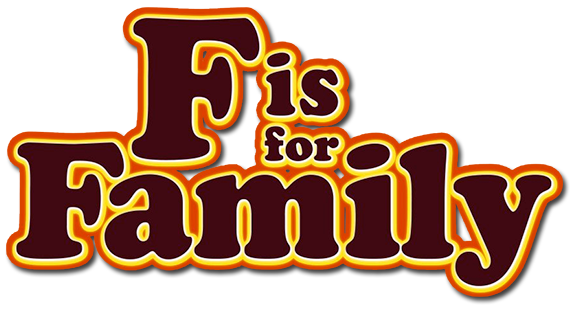
- Genre: Adult animation; Animated sitcom; Black comedy; Comedy drama; Satire
- Created by: Bill Burr; Michael Price
- Voices of: Bill Burr; Laura Dern; Justin Long; Debi Derryberry; Haley Reinhart; Mo Collins; Trevor Devall; Kevin Michael Richardson; Sam Rockwell; Phil Hendrie
- Opening theme: "Come and Get Your Love" by Redbone
- Composers: Vincent Jones; Dave Kushner
- Countries of origin: United States; France; Canada
- Original language: English
- No. of seasons: 5
- No. of episodes: 44 (list of episodes)

Production
- Executive producers: Vince Vaughn; Peter Billingsley; Bill Burr; Katie O'Connell Marsh; Sidonie Dumas; Christophe Riandee; Michael Price; Elisa Todd Ellis; Brittney Segal; Kristen Zolner; Jane Wiseman; Eugene Stein; Nicolas Atlan; Adam Fishbach; David Richardson; Alexandra Hunter; Marc Wilmore; Victoria Vaughn; Eric Goldberg; Peter Tibbals
- Producers: Heath Kenny; Marc Dhrami; Brian J. Cowan; Jean-Baptiste Lere; Valeri Vaughn
- Editors: Paul D. Calder; Karl Laundy; Joe Gressis
- Running time: 25–30 minutes
- Production companies: Wild West Television; Loner Productions; King of France Productions; Gaumont Television USA; Gaumont Animation; Netflix Originals

Original release
- Network: Netflix
- Release: December 18, 2015 – November 25, 2021

F Is for Family is an adult animated sitcom created by Bill Burr and Michael Price for Netflix. It was produced by Vince Vaughn's Wild West Television, King of France Productions, Loner Productions, Gaumont Television USA and Gaumont Animation. Set in 1973–74, the series follows a dysfunctional suburban Irish American family in the fictional town of Rustvale, Pennsylvania.

F Is for Family premiered on December 18, 2015. On October 1, 2020, Netflix renewed it for its fifth and final season and the series ended on November 25, 2021 with a total of 44 episodes over five seasons. The first season contains six episodes; the next three contain ten episodes each; and the final season, eight. The series received acclaim throughout its run, with particular praise for its stark, comic portrait of 1970s America.

== Cast and characters ==
=== Main ===
- Bill Burr as Francis "Frank" Xavier Murphy: a 38-/39-year-old disillusioned, hardworking, brutally honest, short-tempered, Korean War veteran and Purple Heart recipient, husband of Sue Murphy and abusive father of four who works as a baggage handler, and eventually promoted to ground-operations manager, at the local airport, but he became a better man to look at his wife and kids at the end of season five.
  - Burr also voices Father Pat.
- Laura Dern as Susan "Sue" Murphy (née Chilson): Frank's 35-/36-year-old wife, mother of four, and aspiring entrepreneur.
- Justin Long as Kevin Murphy: The Murphys' eldest child; a typical 14-/15-year-old juvenile delinquent and aspiring musician. Kevin spends most of his time at home playing electric guitar and masturbating. Kevin also has aquaphobia, as he almost drowned in a motel pool as a child, an event that traumatizes him to this day. One of Kevin's issues is his immaturity, which grows more when he learns Alice had an ex-boyfriend and struggled to be okay about it, but he finally matured at the end of season five.
  - Long also voices Chuck Sawitzki & Phineas.
- Haley Reinhart as William "Bill" Murphy: The Murphys' 11-/12-year-old prepubescent son who is easily the most normal member of the family who enjoys playing hockey, although he is often too nice and gets taken advantage of. He is, however, unafraid of standing up for himself from time to time with varying degrees of success.
  - Haley Reinhart also voices Frank Murphy as a child.
- Debi Derryberry as Maureen Murphy: The Murphys' 8-/9-/10-year-old daughter, whom Frank always refers to as "princess". She is an intelligent and inquisitive young girl with a passion for science and computers, although she, like Kevin, has a knack for getting herself into trouble on a daily basis.
  - Debi Derryberry also voices:
    - Philip Bonfiglio: Babe and Marie's 11-/12-year-old son, and best friend of Bill. He has a complex caused by his controlling mother and shows subtle signs of repressed homosexuality. He also seems to be repressing his anger with violent and gruesome drawings.
    - Kenny: a friend of Bill and Maureen and is the younger brother of Ben.
    - Bridget Fitzsimmons: Jimmy Fitzsimmons' crude, foul-mouthed 11-year-old younger sister, Maureen's friend. She was named after a bridge in Pittsburgh that her parents had sex under when she was conceived, initially implying that was how she got her first name, until her full name was revealed as "Bridget South Tenth Street Bridge Fitzsimmons".
    - Megan Murphy: a fourth child and younger daughter of the Murphy family. She is the youngest child of Sue and Frank, and the younger sister of Kevin, Bill and Maureen. She was born in the season four finale "Baby, Baby, Baby", being born in October 1974.
    - Others
- Sam Rockwell as Vic Reynolds: A 29-/30-year-old wealthy radio disc jockey who was formerly addicted to cocaine. Despite his former hedonistic lifestyle, he admires Frank for having a wife and children, and is sincerely cordial towards him. Unbeknownst to him, however, his earnest attitude and way of life tends to rub Frank the wrong way. At the end of season four, his child is born. He is shown to be an amiable and protective father towards his son.

=== Co-starring ===
- Trevor Devall as:
  - Bolo, one of Kevin's friends and bandmates.
  - Goomer G. Goomer: Frank's creepy voyeuristic friend and next-door-neighbor and Evelyn's husband.
  - Otto Holtenwasser: The Murphy's elderly neighbor who lived through the Holocaust. Ironically, for most of the series, the children mistakenly believe he is an ex-Nazi.
  - Others
- Mo Collins as:
  - Jimmy Fitzsimmons: A delinquent teenager who frequently bullies Bill. He is shown to be scared of Kevin. As of season 3, he views Bill as his best friend after he saved his life.
  - Vivian Saunders: Sue's employer and sometimes friend. She is often depicted as having narcissistic qualities.
  - Brandy Dunbarton: the widow of the late Roger Dunbarton. She was the former CEO of Mohican Airways before its merger.
  - Claire: a teenage girl from the Murphys' neighborhood.
  - Ben: a friend of Kevin, Bill and Maureen's and the older brother of Kenny.
  - Ginny Throater: A sometimes friend of Sue; she's a bit of a Debbie Downer.
  - Others
- Phil Hendrie as:
  - Jim Jeffords: a smooth-talking television personality who was fired for his live on-air racist remarks. He later helps to expose the mayor for being corrupt.
  - Reid Harrison: an aging overweight Robert Blake-esque TV star who plays Frank's favorite TV character; Colt Luger.
  - Hobo Jojo (season 3–4): a hobo clown character Jim Jeffords played to host a local Saturday cartoon block during which children could play ring toss for prizes.
  - Mr. Durkin (season 3–5): Kevin Murphy's summer school and regular school year math teacher who was known for abusing his students anytime they misbehave. He is shown to struggle with poverty.
  - Others
- Kevin Michael Richardson as:
  - Chauncey "Rosie" Roosevelt: Frank's co-worker at Mohican Airways and elected alderman who unlike his predecessor, genuinely cares for the people in the community he represents.
  - Others

=== Recurring ===
- David Koechner as Robert "Bob Pogo" Pogrohovich, Frank's morbidly obese, selfish, chain smoking former boss and friend. In season 5, when he convinces Mrs. Dunbarton to sell Mohican Airways, he opens up a fast food restaurant that ends up a flop due to the restaurant's less than appealing menu.
- Kevin Farley as:
  - Babe Bonfiglio, a neighbor, one of Frank's friends, husband of Marie, and father of Phillip and Anthony.
  - Carl, a baggage handler, Red's best friend, and one of Frank's co-workers.
  - Dick Sawitzki, owner of the town's electronics store and an old friend of Frank's dad.
  - Others
- Gary Cole (seasons 1–2) as Roger Dunbarton, the owner and founder of Mohican Airways. In the season 2 finale, he was accidentally killed from blood loss when he was hit by debris on the runaway at the airport he owned.
- Joe Buck as:
  - Lou Gagliardi, the president of the International Brotherhood of Baggage Handlers, Skycaps, Roadies and Circus Roustabouts. He is also the current owner of Captain Chucklethrust's.
  - Jimmy Fitzsimmons' dad
  - Rock concert MC
  - Woodshop teacher
  - Mohican Airways commercial VO.
- John DiMaggio (season 2) as Scoop Dunbarton, Roger Dunbarton's racist, brain-damaged, and moronic nephew. He was originally a minor league baseball player until one night in St. Louis when he got drunk after pitching a no-hitter and got kicked in the head while trying to carve his name onto the back end of a Clydesdale horse. For this reason, he has a massive dent in his head. At the end of season 2, he accidentally kills himself and Roger Dunbarton when he steps on a bomb in a briefcase during an attempted hijacking of a plane at (formerly called) Mohican.
- Allison Janney (seasons 2–3) as Henrietta Van Horne, the founder of Plast-A-Ware
- T.J. Miller (seasons 2–3) as Randy, Bill's shady boss for his paper route.
- Michael K. Williams (season 2–5) as Smokey Greenwood, a vending machine product distributor and owner of the Champagne Chariot Vending Services, and one of Rosie's good friends. (Season 5, episode 6 was dedicated to Williams)
- Josh Adam Meyers (season 2–5) as "Howlin'" Hank Howland, a radio DJ who works with Vic at WKWOK 109.5.
- Jessica DiCicco (season 2) as Haircut Girl, a teenage girl only ever referred to as Haircut Girl due to the fact that she gives out free haircuts.
- Vince Vaughn (season 3) as Chet Stevenson, an Air Force veteran with untreated PTSD and an abusive personality who becomes a new neighbor of the Murphys.
- Matt Jones (season 3–4) as Nuber, Kevin's summer school classmate.
- Jamie Denbo (season 3–5) as:
  - Marie Bonfiglio, mother of Philip and Anthony
  - Alice Goldman (season 4–5), Kevin's Jewish classmate and girlfriend who comes from a loving family.
- Al Ducharme (season 3–5) as Anthony Bonfiglio, younger brother of Phillip Bonfiglio who shows signs of autism.
- Eileen Fogarty (season 3–5) as:
  - Evelyn, Goomer's wife and one of Sue's friends.
  - Nguyen-Nguyen Stevenson, Chet's former Vietnamese wife/murderer and former neighbor of the Murphys'. After killing her husband, she was sent to prison.
  - Eileen Murphy (season 5), the daughter of William Murphy and Nora Murphy, and the younger sister of Frank Murphy.
  - Rachel (season 5), One of Alice's friends.
- Jonathan Banks (season 4–5) as William "Big Bill" Murphy, Frank's 73-year-old father who had relentlessly bullied and abused Frank, which caused Frank to resent him greatly as an adult. He acts kinder as an old man, but refuses to acknowledge his past abuse. At Maureen's play he and Frank seem to improve, until he denies when he cruelly mocked Frank at his play and claims he "always been a good father", Big Bill then drops his facade and publicly shows his true nature, it ends when he publicly tells Frank to punch him which Frank complies. At the hospital when Sue gives birth, Big Bill is pointed out by Bill and Maureen that he is the villain; he is the one who made Frank mad and telling him to punch him, this make Big Bill finally recognize he really messed up Frank's upbrining. Big Bill genuine tries to apologize to Frank for all the abuse, when Frank brings his baby to Big Bill; Big Bill suddenly turns lifeless. At the beginning of season 5, he passes away.
- Alex Moffat (season 4) as Sandy Calabasas, Vic's new boss at the radio station.
- Phil LaMarr (season 4–5) as Curtis Higgins, the new African-American television personality, replacing Jeffords as part of an appeasement to people of color after Jeffords was terminated for racist comments on live TV.
  - Others
- Joe Pera (season 4–5) as Alaquippa Ed, a foil and rival to Frank as manager of Alaquippa Airways, the main competitor to Mohican Airlines. In Season 5, Bob Pogo, in an act of delirium, convinced Mrs. Dunbarton to sign a deal that effectively sold Mohican to Alaquippa, merging the two into "Alahican" Airlines, thus making him Frank's supervisor.
- Cree Summer (season 4–5) as Darryl Roosevelt, Rosie and Georgia's son.
- Fred Melamed (season 5) as Dr. Erwin Goldman, A psychologist and the father of Alice Goldman.
- Danny Burstein (season 5) as Officer Glanney, A Police Officer and Bill's boss for the Rustvale Police Department.
- Micah Mason (season 5) as Officer O'Rourke, Glanney's co-worker for the Rustvale Police Department.
- Chris Edgerly (season 5) as:
  - Buster Thunder Jr., A daredevil and parody of Evel Knievel.
  - Others

=== Guest ===
- Kurtwood Smith as Stanley "Stan" Chilson: Sue's arrogant, snobbish and condescending father who disapproved his daughter's marriage to Frank. He is also overbearing over the family as he can't accept that his other child Louis is gay.
- Carol Kane as Marilyn Chilson: Sue's mother
- Amy Sedaris as Samantha, the Lamaze teacher with contempt for men.
- Daryl Mitchell as Chipsy White, the greatest stand-up comedian and actor on There's a Fairy On My Shoulder.
- Will Sasso as Mayor Anthony Tangenti: Rosie's new boss and Mayor of Rustvale who is corrupt and is in cahoots with the mob.
- Neil Patrick Harris as Louis Chilson: Sue's gay brother
- Snoop Dogg as The Rev. Sugar Squires.
- Rich Sommer as Cliff Haskins: The Owner of Invasive Industries.
  - Others
- Cissy Jones as Hannah: One of Alice's friends.
- Nia Renée Hill as Georgia Roosevelt: Rosie Roosevelt's wife.
- Patti LuPone as Nora Murphy: The mother of Frank and Eileen Murphy, and paternal grandmother of Frank's children, Kevin, Bill, Maureen and Megan Murphy. Nora is also the ex-wife of William Murphy, having been married to him for about twenty years before divorcing. Nora is also the wife of Earl Gribble.

== Episodes ==
| Season | Episodes | Originally released |
|---|---|---|
| 1 | 6 | December 18, 2015 |
| 2 | 10 | May 30, 2017 |
| 3 | 10 | November 30, 2018 |
| 4 | 10 | June 12, 2020 |
| 5 | 8 | November 25, 2021 |

== Production ==
Season 1 promotional poster

The series was announced in October 2014 as part of a partnership between Netflix, Gaumont International Television, and Wild West Television. The show is a "family comedy" based on the standup of Bill Burr. Moreover, the show takes place in the 1970s, "a time when you could smack your kid, smoke inside, and bring a gun to the airport". Burr voices the Murphy family patriarch, with Laura Dern as his wife, Justin Long as his eldest son, Debi Derryberry as his daughter Maureen, and Haley Reinhart as his young son. The first season consists of six episodes, shown in a serial manner, written by Bill Burr and Michael Price. Price is best known for his Emmy and Writers Guild award-winning work on The Simpsons. The series is directed by Ben Marsaud (director of Counterfeit Cat & former storyboard artist on The Amazing World of Gumball). Season 2 premiered May 30, 2017. On June 28, 2017, the show was renewed for a third season. On July 1, 2018, Burr confirmed season three. On November 30, 2018, the third season was released. On January 24, 2019, the show was renewed for a fourth season, which was released on June 12, 2020. On October 1, 2020, Netflix renewed the series for the fifth and final season which was released on November 25, 2021.

On his Monday Morning Podcast from July 24, 2025, Bill Burr mentioned that he had been reviewing scripts for F Is for Family. While production and commissioning of TV shows is complicated and nothing is for certain, this might mean development work for a sixth season is underway.

Many references are made to the city of Pittsburgh in the series, a city that Burr has visited frequently on his stand-up tours and shares a hatred of the Philadelphia Flyers with local sportscaster Mark Madden. This has included the characters flying over the Pittsburgh exurb of Steubenville, Ohio on their way to Cleveland and said jokes about Pittsburgh being made in Cleveland, the character of Bridget Fitzsimmons wanting to run away to Pittsburgh, and the airline Alaquippa Airlines being named after the Pittsburgh suburb of Aliquippa, Pennsylvania.

== Analysis ==
F Is for Family has been described as "a direct attack on the ideals and assumptions we associate with the American Dream". Throughout its 5-season run, the series satirizes and explores several issues exclusive to the socioeconomic and cultural upheaval of 1970s America, including those with or within marriage, labor, economy, war, masculinity, feminism, sexism, domestic abuse, racism, political corruption, education, sexuality and adolescence.

=== Disillusion of the American Dream ===
In an essay on why the series is the perfect satire on the American Dream, Author Jack C. Fisher argues that Frank Murphy personifies the general disillusionment with the Dream that took place during the economic stagnation of the early-1970s: "Take everything you think you know about what it means to work hard, get ahead, and achieve your goals in life. Then, kick it in the gut, spit on it, and throw it through a brick wall. That's Frank Murphy's life. That's what F Is for Family is all about." He writes that Frank's belligerent personality is a byproduct of that said disillusionment and cites the transformation he goes through in the series' opening sequence as reflecting who he used to be: "an upbeat, optimistic man who reflected the spirit of his time and his country".

=== Masculinity in crisis ===
In an essay on the series, cultural historian Shalon van Tine argues that the primary theme explored in F Is for Family is the "changing nature of masculinity in the 1970s", mostly depicted through Frank Murphy's perspective: "Frank believes in hard work and feels that the traditional family structure is ideal, but throughout the show, he learns the hard truth that the American dream is a lie. Much of his persona is based around the notion that he must be a 'good man'—one who served his country in the Korean War, married his girl when she got pregnant, works a dead-end job to provide for his family, and raises three rowdy kids to stay out of trouble. Yet, Frank's masculinity is constantly challenged, beginning with him losing his job." "For the average man in the Seventies, and for most of the twentieth century for that matter, losing his job meant losing his identity. The concept of 'being a man' was heavily wrapped up in one's work and ability to provide for his family"; Van Tine notes that after losing his job at Mohican Airways, Frank also begins to lose his traditional attributes of masculinity such as a rugged individualism and having the higher likelihood to initiate sex, until he completely loses his "male confidence" and feels too ashamed to even file for unemployment. When Frank's housewife, Sue Murphy, picks up a job and succeeds at where he is failing, Frank feels so emasculated and insecure at the shift in gender roles that, in one instance, he tries to sabotage her promotion. In a later confrontation, he confesses to wanting to see her fail, saying "As a man, I have to do better or what am I?".

== Reception ==
F Is for Family has received consistently positive reviews throughout its run. On Metacritic, it holds a score of 75 out of 100, based on 14 reviews, indicating "Generally favorable reviews".

=== Season 1 ===
The first season was released to positive reviews. On Rotten Tomatoes, it holds a rating of 85% based on 20 reviews, with an average score of 6.5/10. The site's critical consensus reads, "While the humor relies on vulgarity, the strength of F Is for Family is its substantial heart."

In his review for The Hollywood Reporter, David Fienberg called the series "entertainingly honest", praising the writing, animation and voice acting. Zack Handlen of The A.V. Club described it as a "bitter, but deeply empathetic portrayal of suburban malaise and depression that also doubles as a very funny TV show". Emily St. James of Vox wrote that "F Is for Family is quite a bit of fun" adding, "it isn't a bad way to kill a few hours".

=== Season 2 ===
The series received further critical acclaim with its second season, which holds an approval rating of 89% on Rotten Tomatoes based on 9 reviews with an average rating 7.1/10. The consensus on the season reads: "F Is for Family is a little grouchier and wiser in its second season, evoking an era of American decay with warm pastel hues and articulating blue collar angst through Bill Burr's blustery delivery".

In his review for IndieWire, Ben Travers praised the season for its dramatic shift in genre, writing "F Is for Family illustrates why it's important to see series for what they are, rather than through the genre lens thrust upon them."

=== Season 3 ===
In a positive review of the third season, Merrill Barr of Forbes concluded: "Overall, the third season of F Is for Family continues to deliver on the things that make it such a worthy and unique addition to the Netflix landscape."

== Awards and nominations ==
| Year | Award | Category | Nominee | Result | Ref. |
|---|---|---|---|---|---|
| 2017 | Primetime Emmy Award | Outstanding Character Voice-Over Performance | Mo Collins as Ginny, Jimmy Fitzsimmons, Lex, Ben, and Cutie Pie (Episode: "Pray Away") | Nominated | |
| 2019 | Primetime Emmy Award | Outstanding Character Voice-Over Performance | Kevin Michael Richardson as Chauncey "Rosie" Roosevelt (Episode: "The Stinger") | Nominated | |
