= All About Lulu =

2008 book by Jonathan Evison

- Author: Jonathan Evison
- Language: English
- Publisher: Soft Skull Press
- Publication date: 2008 July 21
- Publication place: United States
- Media type: Print (Paperback)
- Pages: 344 pp
- ISBN: 978-1-59376-196-7
- OCLC: 181517136
- Dewey Decimal: 813/.6 22
- LC Class: PS3605.V57 A795 2008

All About Lulu is a coming-of-age novel by American author Jonathan Evison published in 2008. The novel revolves around a family of bodybuilders in Santa Monica from the Summer of Love to the Dot-com bubble.

== Plot summary ==
In the wake of his mother's death, as his bodybuilding brethren pump themselves to Hulkish proportions, weak-eyed vegetarian Will Miller stops growing altogether—until the day his father remarries a relentlessly kind grief counselor, delivering Will a troubled stepsister who soon becomes his confessor, companion, and heart's only desire. But when Lulu returns from cheerleading camp the summer of her fourteenth year, she inexplicably begins to push Will away, forcing him to look elsewhere for meaning.

== Themes ==
Major themes in All About Lulu include self-improvement, family, unrequited love, obsession, the American dream, talk radio, and meat.

== Reception ==
All About Lulu received a starred review in Publishers Weekly (5/12/08), who called the book “a stunner—viciously funny and deeply felt.” In subsequent reviews, including the Los Angeles Times, San Francisco Chronicle, and Seattle P.I., the novel was compared both favorably and unfavorably to J.D. Salinger's The Catcher in the Rye, and Vladimir Nabokov's Lolita. In addition to being selected for the Los Angeles Times and Seattle PI summer reading lists, All About Lulu was selected for numerous year-end "Top 10" and "Best of" lists, including Hudson, and Time Out Chicago, and won the 2009 Washington State Book Award.

== Film Adaptation ==
- All About Lulu was optioned for film in 2008 by Crossroads Films. The film rights to two earlier novels, Welcome Avenue and The Ray of Hope Foundation, were also optioned in 2008, to actor/producer Joseph Cross, and Streetgang Films, respectively. Projects are in various stages of development.
