= Rachel Cronin =

Canadian actress

- Born: September 29, 1971 (age 54); Alberta, Canada
- Education: University of British Columbia (BFA)
- Occupation: Actress
- Years active: 1995–2009

Rachel Cronin (born September 29, 1971) is a Canadian actress, best known for her role as Shirley Pifko on the NBC television series Ed.

== Early life ==
Cronin's father was Edmond Jude Cronin, a provincial court judge. She was born in Alberta and grew up in Vancouver, British Columbia. She attended Argyle Secondary School, a high school which emphasised the arts, where she won awards and bursaries for her acting. She was then accepted to the University of British Columbia Bachelor of Fine Arts Acting Program and graduated top of her class. Cronin has since been working in theatre, television and film, and in 2000 she was signed on to play the eccentric Shirley Pifko on Ed.

== Film and television filmography ==
=== Film ===
Year	Title	Role	Notes
1996	Cat Swallows Parakeet and Speaks!	Snow White	
1998	Y2K	Wendy Allison	Short film
2003	Spook	Kelly	

=== Television ===
Year	Title	Role	Notes
1995	Eye Level	Hotel Manager	TV movie
1997	Poltergeist: The Legacy	Janice	1 episode: s02e18 "Fear"
1998	The Outer Limits	GRS Girl - Melanie	1 episode: s04e01 "Criminal Nature"
2000	They Nest	Respiratory Technician	TV movie
2000–2004	Ed	Shirley Pifko	Series regular
2006	This Space for Rent	Joan Forbes	
2009	Reaper	Mary Pat	1 episode: s02e13 "The Devil and Sam Oliver"
