= In Memoriam (2026 film) =

American comedy film

- Directed by: Rob Burnett
- Written by: Rob Burnett
- Produced by: Rob Burnett; Marc Maron; David Martin; Nicky Weinstock; Divya D’Souza
- Starring: Marc Maron; Lily Gladstone; Judy Greer; Talia Ryder; Michael McKean; Justin Long; Alan Ruck; Sharon Stone
- Cinematography: Barry Peterson
- Edited by: Lee Haxall
- Music by: Will Bates
- Production companies: Avalon; Invention Studios
- Release date: June 7, 2026 (Tribeca Festival)
- Running time: 118 minutes
- Country: United States
- Language: English

In Memoriam is a 2026 American comedy film written and directed by Rob Burnett. It stars Marc Maron, Lily Gladstone, Judy Greer, Talia Ryder, Michael McKean, Justin Long, Alan Ruck, and Sharon Stone. The plot follows an aging actor who, after being diagnosed with terminal cancer, becomes obsessed with securing a spot in the Academy Awards' "In Memoriam" segment.

The film was co-produced by Avalon and Invention Studios. Principal photography took place in Los Angeles in late 2024. In Memoriam premiered at the Tribeca Festival on June 7, 2026.

== Premise ==
Faced with his terminal cancer, an aging actor becomes obsessed with being included amongst the In Memoriam section of the Academy Awards ceremony.

== Cast ==
- Marc Maron as Langston Stanfield
- Lily Gladstone as Samantha, Langston's therapist
- Judy Greer as Chelsea, Langston's ex-wife
- Talia Ryder as Maura, Langston and Chelsea's daughter
- Michael McKean as Walter, Langston's manager
- Sharon Stone as Vicky Cash, a movie star and Langston's ex-wife who has cancer
- Megalyn Echikunwoke as Rachel, a Public Relations expert
- Justin Long as Jack Stackhouse
- Alan Ruck as Jeremy Marvin
- Amanda Booth as Aurora
- Vivienne Lucille as Little Frannie
- Matthew Gold as Arno
- Merrick Hanna as Ricky
- Mila Degray as Mila Degray
- Jimmy Kimmel as himself
- Guillermo Rodriguez as himself

== Production ==
The film is written and directed by Rob Burnett. Nicholas Weinstock and Divya D’Souza are producers with Burnett and David Martin from Avalon, alongside Marc Maron, who leads a cast that also contains Judy Greer, Talia Ryder, Lily Gladstone, Sharon Stone, Michael McKean, Justin Long and Vivienne Lucille. Principal photography began in Los Angeles in October 2024. In November, Alan Ruck joined the cast.

== Release ==
In Memoriam premiered at the Tribeca Festival on June 7, 2026.

== Reception ==
On the review aggregator website Rotten Tomatoes, 100% of 11 critics' reviews are positive, with an average rating of 7.6/10.

Pete Hammond of Deadline wrote that it's "a sharp character study of a man nearing the end and finding out the real meaning of life before his hits the end credits."
