= Merrick Hanna =

American dancer (born 2005)

- Hanna at VidCon 2026
- Born: Merrick William Hanna; March 22, 2005 (age 21); Encinitas, California
- Years active: 2015–present

Instagram information
- Page: Merrick Hanna
- Followers: 2.9 million

TikTok information
- Page: Merrick
- Followers: 32.6 million

YouTube information
- Channel: Merrick Hanna
- Genre: Dance
- Subscribers: 17.2 million
- Views: 13.3 billion
- Last updated: July 23, 2026

Merrick William Hanna (born March 22, 2005) is an American dancer, actor, and social media personality. Known for his popping and storytelling, he reached the semifinals of season 12 of America's Got Talent in 2017.

== Early life ==
Merrick William Hanna was born on March 22, 2005, in Encinitas, California. His parents are Shawn and Aletha Hanna; Shawn's mother, Judith Lynne Hanna, is a dance author and academic who was a dance anthropology professor at the University of Maryland, College Park. Hanna has a younger brother, Sagan. He did not talk until he was three and found it hard to make eye contact, but he was able to open up using toy robots. He also acted in professional Shakespeare plays as a child. He gave up soccer for dancing in 2014, finding it more fun and personal. Hanna originally took classes at the Magdalena Ecke Family YMCA under Cameron Greene and was also assisted by Poppin John of the SoulBiotics Krew.

== Career ==
In 2017, Hanna reached the semifinals of season 12 of America's Got Talent. During his audition, which was inspired by the fellow San Diego-based group Jabbawockeez, judge Simon Cowell called his act "one of the best performances [he's] ever seen on the show." A video of Hanna's audition went viral on YouTube, garnering 13.4 million views in three months. He choreographed and wrote the story for his dances himself. Prior to appearing on America's Got Talent, Hanna had also danced on So You Think You Can Dance: The Next Generation, Lip Sync Battle Shorties, The Ellen DeGeneres Show, and various commercials, including H&M, Honda, and Gap Kids.

After America's Got Talent, Hanna began gaining success on TikTok, starting a dance trend based on his signature robotic movements. In 2020, he joined the content house VibeCrew. He then had a recurring role in the Brat TV series Attaway General in 2021. In 2024, Hanna was invited to the 2024 Democratic National Convention, filming videos there to encourage people to vote.

== Filmography ==
=== Film ===
Year	Title	Role	Notes
2021	Alienated	Teen David Bennett	
2022	A Genie's Tail	Oliver Jones	
2023	Dumb Money	Skit Guy	
2026	In Memoriam	Ricky	

=== Television ===
Year	Title	Role	Notes
2019–2022	Mani	Goth Boy Edward	Recurring role
2020	Bob Hearts Abishola	Dancer #3	Episode: "The Canadians of Africa"
2020	Team Kaylie	Bradley	Episode: "Crossing Wires"
2020	Sydney to the Max	Joe	Episode: "Sister Pact"
2021	Velvet Prozak	Billy	Episode: "Cougar Hunting
2021–2022	Attaway General	Edward	Recurring role
2024	The Really Loud House	Scotty Shoemaker	Voice role; 2 episodes

== Awards and nominations ==
Year	Award	Category	Result	Ref.
2018	Shorty Awards	Best in Dance	Nominated	
2022	Streamy Awards	Dance	Nominated	
2023	Streamy Awards	Dance	Nominated	
