= David Richardson (writer) =

American television producer and writer (1955–2021)

- Born: December 24, 1955; Phoenix, Arizona
- Died: January 18, 2021 (aged 65); Los Angeles, California
- Notable works: The Simpsons; Malcolm in the Middle; Two and a Half Men; F Is for Family

David Wayne Richardson (December 24, 1955 – January 18, 2021) was an American television writer and producer who wrote for The Simpsons ("Homer Loves Flanders"), Malcolm in the Middle, Two and a Half Men, and F Is for Family. Richardson, a cancer survivor for nearly thirty years, died of heart failure in early 2021.

== Filmography ==
Writer

- Zoobilee Zoo (3 episodes, 1986)
- The Pat Sajak Show (2 episodes, 1989)
- Star Street: The Adventures of the Star Kids (1989)
- Grand (4 episodes, 1990)
- Empty Nest (7 episodes, 1991–1993)
- Phenom (2 episodes, 1993)
- The Simpsons (1 episode, 1994)
  - "Homer Loves Flanders" (1994)
- The John Larroquette Show (1 episode, 1995)
- Local Heroes (2 episodes, 1996)
- Soul Man (1 episode, 1997)
- Manhattan, AZ (2 episodes, 2000)
- Malcolm in the Middle (3 episodes, 2000)
- What About Joan (2001)
- Ed (1 episode, 2002)
- Married to the Kellys (1 episode, 2003)
- Two and a Half Men (9 episodes, 2009–2011)
- F Is for Family (2 episodes, 2015)

Producer

- Phenom (1993)
- The Simpsons (11 episodes, 1993–1994)
- Malcolm in the Middle (12 episodes, 2000)
- Manhattan, AZ (2000)
- Ed (5 episodes, 2002)
- My Big Fat Greek Life (2003)
- Married to the Kellys (4 episodes, 2003)
- Peep Show (2008)
- Two and a Half Men (7 episodes, 2009–2010)

== Awards and nominations ==
- 1995, won Humanitas Prize, "30 minute category" for The John Larroquette Show
