= The Revised Fundamentals of Caregiving =

2012 novel by Jonathan Evison

- The Revised Fundamentals of Caregiving (hardcover dustjacket)
- Author: Jonathan Evison
- Genre: Tragicomedy
- Set in: Pacific Northwest
- Published: 2012
- Publisher: Algonquin Books
- Pages: 278
- ISBN: 978-1-61620-039-8
- Website: algonquin.com/revisedfundamentals/

The Revised Fundamentals of Caregiving is a 2012 novel by American author Jonathan Evison. The novel's plot revolves around the relationship between the titular caregiver, Ben Benjamin, and his teenage charge, Trevor Conklin, who suffers from Duchenne muscular dystrophy. The two take a road trip together and encounter a variety of characters and roadside attractions along their way to their ultimate destination, Trevor's father Bob. Evison dedicated the book to one of his patients, Case Levenson, a man with Duchenne muscular dystrophy, citing their experience together as a major inspiration for the novel. Evison also credits a family tragedy with inspiring the road trip sequence. The movie The Fundamentals of Caring, released in June 2016, is based on the book.

== Plot summary ==
The book (and adapted film) follows a 39-year-old man who has experienced personal tragedy and is currently climbing out of depression and grief. His estranged wife has been waiting for months for him to sign divorce papers. He has lost his work and his house. After being trained as a care-giver, his first job is for a boy with muscular dystrophy, 19-year-old Trev. The disease has taken the movement of Trev's body, but definitely not the spark from his brain and quick, silver-tongued wit. The two find a match in each other, supporting each other in quiet or razzing ways, and ultimately pushing each other to move beyond their deep-rooted and insurmountable sorrows (one from loss, the other from the impending loss of his life from a disease). The strong theme is about love and connection. In the end, this is a story about valuing life and how fragile life is, how precious it is, and how — despite the inevitability of death — the path to that end (including love) is what matters.

== Reception ==
Jennifer Gilmore, author of "The Mothers" novel (2013) wrote a Sunday Book Review in The New York Times about this third novel from Evison. Gilmore highlights the road trip, stating "... the journey is reckless and wild, infused with the sad rage that makes good comedy great. Ben’s powers of observation make this trip unforgettable."

Ron Charles reviewed the novel for The Washington Post. Charles stated the novel is "not perfect" but is "moving and funny" and pointed out how one of Evison's own odd jobs as a caregiver lent him insight into telling "a story about someone caring for a disabled person that isn’t gauzed in sentimentality or bitterness."

Other critics were generally positive, with The A.V. Club's Phil Dyess-Nugent praising Evison's comic ability, saying that "[Evison] can be funny like nobody else, about things few other writers would risk laughing about," although Jennifer Weiner, writing for NPR, found the banter between Trevor and Ben to be distracting, giving the caveat that "when Evison's not trotting out his Urban Dictionary-level expertise about increasingly absurd sex acts, the writing can be lovely".

== Translations ==
A German translation was published in 2015 as Umweg nach Hause [Detour to Home].

== Adaptation ==
The book was adapted into an indie film entitled The Fundamentals of Caring, starring Paul Rudd, Selena Gomez, Craig Roberts, Jennifer Ehle, and Megan Ferguson.
