= Ed (TV series) =

American comedy drama television series (2000–2004)

- Genre: Comedy drama
- Created by: Jon Beckerman; Rob Burnett
- Starring: Tom Cavanagh; Julie Bowen; Jana Marie Hupp; Josh Randall; Lesley Boone; Michael Ian Black; Rachel Cronin; Mike Starr; Justin Long; Daryl "Chill" Mitchell
- Theme music composer: Dave Grohl (seasons 1 and 3–4); Eef Barzelay (season 2)
- Opening theme: "Next Year" by Foo Fighters (seasons 1 and 3–4) "Moment in the Sun" by Clem Snide (season 2)
- Country of origin: United States
- Original language: English
- No. of seasons: 4
- No. of episodes: 83 (list of episodes)

Production
- Executive producers: Jon Beckerman; Rob Burnett; David Letterman
- Producers: Merrill H. Karpf; Tom Cavanagh; Jude Brennan; Andrew Dettmann; Kathleen McGill; Andrea Newman; Kevin Dowling
- Running time: 42 minutes
- Production companies: Worldwide Pants Incorporated; NBC Studios; Viacom Productions

Original release
- Network: NBC
- Release: October 8, 2000 – February 6, 2004

Ed is an American comedy drama television series created by Jon Beckerman and Rob Burnett that aired on NBC from October 8, 2000, to February 6, 2004. Executive produced by David Letterman, the show was produced by Letterman's Worldwide Pants Incorporated in association with NBC Productions and Viacom Productions.

The hour-long comedy drama starred Tom Cavanagh as the lead titular character Ed Stevens, Julie Bowen as his love interest Carol Vessey, Josh Randall as his long-time best friend Dr. Mike Burton, Jana Marie Hupp as Mike's wife Nancy, Lesley Boone as their friend Molly Hudson, and Justin Long as awkward high-school student Warren Cheswick. Other supporting cast members included Michael Genadry and Ginnifer Goodwin as Warren's friends Mark and Diane, and Michael Ian Black, Mike Starr, Rachel Cronin, and (later) Daryl Mitchell as the employees of Ed's bowling alley. Long-term guest stars included John Slattery as Dennis Martino and Sabrina Lloyd as Frankie Hector.

Ed received casting, writing, and directing Primetime Emmy Award nominations in 2001. Tom Cavanagh received a Golden Globe Award nomination and a TV Guide Award for his work on the series. The series has never been released on DVD nor on any streaming services, in part due to music rights and the show being co-owned by two studios.

== Premise ==
The show revolves around Ed Stevens, a hotshot New York lawyer who, on the same day he is fired from his job (for drafting a contract with a misplaced comma that ended up costing his firm $1.6 million), comes home to discover his wife having an affair with a mailman that she claims she met at Starbucks. Dejected, Ed decides to return to his hometown, which is the fictional town of Stuckeyville, Ohio. Upon his arrival, he is reunited with friends that he has missed, as well as Carol Vessey, his high school crush. Determined to win her heart, Ed decides to stay, buying a rundown bowling alley and setting up a new law firm in the process, earning him the undesired nickname "The Bowling Alley Lawyer" which leads him to make a distinction to a judge during one of his first trials: "I am a lawyer, I own a bowling alley. Two separate things."

Ed has a number of running gags, such as bowling alley employee Phil (Michael Ian Black) hatching ludicrous schemes usually to gain fame and fortune, ten-dollar bets between Ed and his best friend, Mike, that would require one of them to do something extremely embarrassing, mentions of Arbor Day as a big holiday, and various characters named "Godfrey" appearing in many episodes. The series also deals with issues of social popularity and self-esteem both through Ed—who was unpopular in high school and yet had a crush on stereotypically popular blond cheerleader Carol Vessey—and through Molly, Carol's coworker and friend who was similarly unpopular in high school and continues to have self-esteem issues due to her being overweight.

== Episodes ==
Season	Episodes	Originally released	
Season	Episodes	First released	Last released
1	22	October 8, 2000	May 23, 2001
2	22	October 10, 2001	May 15, 2002
3	22	September 25, 2002	April 11, 2003
4	17	September 24, 2003	February 6, 2004

== Cast ==
=== Main ===
- Tom Cavanagh as Edward Jeremy "Ed" Stevens. A lawyer who worked for a prestigious law firm in New York City, he loses his job for drafting a contract with a misplaced comma and on the same day catches his wife having an affair with a mailman. Reeling from his broken relationship with his wife he returns to his home town of Stuckeyville where he reconnects with old friends and pursues his high school crush, Carol Vessey. After being kissed by Carol he is inspired to buy the bowling alley, Stuckeybowl, move back to Stuckeyville, and opens a legal practice inside of it. Ed comes to represent many of the townspeople in court and makes several attempts to win Carol Vessey for three years. Ed and Carol develop a deep friendship, and while Carol is in love with him, she resists dating Ed because she is afraid it will ruin their relationship. Ed is a compassionate and caring man and often takes cases where he represents the underdogs. While he sometimes finds himself working for people he disagrees with he still treats all of his clients with fairness. He also believes that the law, common sense, and moderation need not be mutually exclusive.
- Julie Bowen as Carol Phyllis Vessey. The object of Ed's affection, Carol was a beautiful and popular cheerleader in high school, and Ed has had feelings for her since he first saw her in freshman biology. She has stayed in Stuckeyville most of her life and teaches English at Stuckeyville High School. She is also an aspiring writer. At the beginning of the series she is seen dating a long-term boyfriend, a fellow English teacher Nick Stanton, but she breaks up with him shortly after Ed returns. She starts to develop feelings for Ed but is afraid of starting a relationship with him because her relationships typically end badly. She also believes Ed has expectations of her that she will never be able to live up to. She almost marries Stuckeyville High School's new principal Dennis Martino (John Slattery), but she is left at the altar as Dennis realizes that she is in love with Ed. Later in the series she comes to understand that she does truly love Ed and that Ed truly loves her. Ed and Carol marry in the series finale.
- Jana Marie Hupp as Nancy Burton. Mike's wife and a good friend of Ed and Carol's, she is originally a working mother in marketing, then later becomes a substitute teacher at Stuckeyville High, and then finally a guidance counselor where she is well liked by the students at Stuckeyville. She is often seen as having a sense of moderation and wisdom for everyone in the series, often rolling her eyes at Mike's and Ed's antics, but she is a good friend to Ed and a loving, loyal and supportive wife to her husband.
- Josh Randall as Dr. Michael "Mike" Burton. He is Ed's best friend and has been since their high school days. He is now a doctor, starting out working for the cantankerous Dr. Jerome, but branches out and starts his own practice. A graduate of Johns Hopkins Medical School, he is very caring towards his patients and takes his oath and role as a physician very seriously. He is happily married to his wife Nancy Burton (Jana Marie Hupp), having known her since high school as well and has a young daughter named Sarah. Mike is also shown to be a good athlete as a runner, basketball player, and wrestler.
- Lesley Boone as Molly Hudson. Carol's best friend and a chemistry teacher at Stuckeyville High who eventually becomes the principal. Molly was unpopular in high school but becomes close friends with Carol and Nancy. She is Ed's first client when he tries her case and wins which inspires Ed to open his own practice in the bowling alley. Molly has insecurity issues due to her feeling that Carol is always the better half, but comes to assert herself more and more as the series goes on. She is liked by her students as a teacher and principal, and despite her insecurities, she is courted by many men during the series. During the bouquet toss at Carol and Ed's wedding, she does not catch the bouquet but rather has it given to her by Carol as a sign of their deep friendship.
- Michael Ian Black as Philip "Phil" Stubbs. Phil is a natural slacker who runs the front counter at Stuckeybowl. He does not take his job very seriously and is always trying to hatch get-rich-quick schemes, using the bowling alley as a means to do so. He is terrible in managing his own money as he lives in a Motel 6 after he had been sleeping on the far right lane in the bowling alley. His schemes seem to get under Ed's skin from time to time, but Phil is a loyal employee to Ed who refers to him as "Bosco" as a term of endearment. He is an ordained minister by the fictional "Grand Exalted Church of the Universe" via the internet and performs Ed and Carol's wedding as the original minister refused to do so in a bowling alley.
- Rachel Cronin as Shirley Pifko. Shirley also works at Stuckeybowl and is a very awkward and shy person who has odd and quirky personality traits, but is liked by Ed and all of the main characters. She breaks character from time to time by trying to help others in personal situations and is shown to be ambitious and a worker who strives to take her role at the bowling alley seriously. She also serves as Ed's legal assistant after asking for the job.
- Mike Starr as Kenny Sandusky (seasons 1–2; guest season 3). Kenny is a lovable and loyal Stuckeybowl employee who is a talented bowler and also is the brains behind many of the events that the bowling puts on. He helps Ed turn the bowling alley from a dump where nobody goes into an attractive place. After bowling a perfect game in the third season, Kenny tells Ed he has "done all I was meant to do" and leaves the bowling alley and hugs Ed goodbye.
- Justin Long as Warren Cheswick. Warren is an awkward yet good-natured student at Stuckeyville High. He is in love with Jessica Martell, the most popular girl at his school. Ed feels a kinship to him as he reminds Ed of himself at that age. While he can be overbearing at times, Warren's friends Mark, Diane, and Gavin accept his quirks and are there to help him when he is in tough situations.
- Michael R. Genadry as Mark Vanacor (seasons 2–4; recurring season 1). Mark is Warren's best friend and closest confidant. After Mark's father has a heart attack, Mark is confronted by Mike, Warren and Diane about his severe weight problem to undergo a gastric bypass surgery. Initially refusing, he realizes his very life is on the line and loses over 200 pounds after the surgery.
- Ginnifer Goodwin as Diane Snyder (seasons 2–3). Diane is a smart and assertive student who is Warren's friend and later Mark's girlfriend.
- Daryl Mitchell as Eli Goggins (seasons 3–4). A young, focused, and effective employee, he joins the Stuckeybowl team in Season 3. He is proactive in his approach and is given the job of alley manager by Ed as he is impressed by Eli's ideas and work ethic. He is a paraplegic who became paralyzed in a motor cycle accident and struggles with insecurity, but is assured by Phil and Shirley that he is worthy of a good life and a woman who accepts him as he is. He later is seen dating a young and attractive baker. A young black male, he often makes jokes about African-American stereotypes.

=== Recurring ===
- Gregory Harrison as Nick Stanton. A self-absorbed ex-boyfriend of Carol's, he is also an English teacher and aspires to be a great writer. He takes Carol for granted which leads her to break up with him. After they break up, he is seen in only one more episode before moving on.
- Marvin Chatinover as Dr. Walter Jerome. He is a doctor who owns the practice where Mike works at the beginning of the series. He wants Mike to succeed in his practice, so he is strict in his methods and often berates and insults Mike, but does so with the goal of making Mike a good doctor and effective physician. Although he can be cantankerous, his methods are meant to keep his medical practice in high esteem.
- Rena Sofer as Bonnie Haine. A district attorney for Stuckeyville, she and Ed clash and do battle with each other in court, but Bonnie tells Ed she likes him, causing a rift between him and Carol. They start to date, but it ends when Bonnie takes a job in Washington, D.C. She briefly returns in season 2 to try to get Ed back, but she becomes fully aware Ed is in love with Carol.
- John Slattery as Dennis Martino. The new principal at the high school in season 2, he and Carol take an instant and strong disliking to each other. He is blunt, withdrawn, and egotistical. He is a recovering alcoholic who battles his urges every day, causing Carol to show pity on him, which then leads to a romance, an engagement and almost a marriage. Dennis leaves Carol at the altar when it is obvious that Carol is in love with Ed despite wanting to marry Dennis. He leaves Stuckeyville and is never seen or heard from again.
- Robin Paul as Jessica Martell, a beautiful popular girl at Stuckeyville High. She is the object of Warren's affections. She initially turns Warren down twice, until she realizes that he truly likes her for her and eventually falls for Warren, though their relationship is short lived as she moves schools due to her parents' divorce.
- Lea Thompson as Liz Stevens, Ed's ex-wife. She makes an appearance in the fourth season and finds it hard to completely let Ed go even after their divorce is finalized.
- Nicki Aycox as Stella Vessey, Carol's younger sister. A free spirit, she travels around searching for her purpose in life, but forms a short yet strong relationship with Warren on two occasions.
- Kelly Ripa as Jennifer Bradley. A free spirited woman who falls for Ed, she tries to win him over even though Ed is struggling with the fact Carol is about to marry Dennis. They almost end up leaving for Africa with each other, but Jennifer, like all others realizes that she is Ed's second choice and refuses to wait around for him, but remains a friend to help him with his heartbreak over Carol.
- Dan Lauria as Richard Vessey. Carol Vessey's Father. He deeply loves his daughter and is hesitant to give Ed his blessing after witnessing Carol being left at the altar by Dennis. He eventually comes to realize that Ed is not Dennis and that he will not leave his daughter. Originally a widower, he has gotten remarried and is seen with his new wife in the series finale.
- Sabrina Lloyd as Frankie Hector. Frankie moves to Stuckeyville and convinces Ed to take her on as a partner in his law firm, and the two develop a romance. Like all other women in Ed's life, she senses that Carol had Ed's heart. She gives Ed an ultimatum, for either her or Carol. She leaves after Ed does not give her a reason to stay and moves back to Houston, Texas to work things out with her ex-boyfriend.
- Mike Hodge as the Judge (7 episodes)

=== Guest appearances ===
The series has featured a number of guest stars, including, Janeane Garofalo, Marianne Hagan, Eddie Bracken, Joanna Going, Suzanne Shepherd, M. Emmet Walsh, Philip Bosco, Charles S. Dutton, John Goodman, Adam Wylie, Curtis Armstrong, Stephen Root, Neil Patrick Harris, Chris Elliott, Vincent Pastore, Keir Dullea, Josh Duhamel, Danny DeVito, Jim Parsons, Tim Matheson, John Krasinski, Taye Diggs, Molly Shannon, Chris Isaak, James Barbour, Christopher Lloyd, Burt Reynolds, and Mädchen Amick.

== Production ==
=== Pilot ===
While the premise of the show hinges on the changes in Ed's life in New York and his initial return to Stuckeyville, the pilot which illustrated these events was not aired as part of the series. A summary using footage from the pilot, appeared at the beginning of the first regular episode.

The pilot also contained some notable casting choices, with Donal Logue portraying Phil and Janeane Garofalo guest-starring as Ed's ex-wife Liz. Michael Ian Black replaced Logue as Phil in re-shot scenes of the first episode and for the entire series, and a number of different actresses played Liz in her few appearances (including Lea Thompson who played the character in several episodes near the end of the series).

The show was originally called Ed, then titled Stuckeyville when in development at CBS, and then renamed Ed again when it was picked up by NBC.

=== Locations ===
Although set in the fictional town of Stuckeyville, Ohio, the majority of the series was actually shot in various towns in northern New Jersey including Montclair, Hillsdale, Haworth, Westfield, Cranford, Nutley, Ridgewood, Harrington Park, Allendale, Northvale, Demarest and Rockland County, New York (Tappan, Nyack). Many of the street names and towns mentioned on the show are real New Jersey street and town names. The opening sequence showed Ed driving past the Rialto movie theater in the downtown of Westfield. Stuckeybowl was actually the former Country Club Lanes in Northvale, NJ, and also served as the show's headquarters. Many of the show's other sets were built in a cleared out portion of the bowling alley such as the interiors of Stuckeyville High School, the courtroom, and The Smiling Goat. Country Club Lanes has since gone out of business, and was completely demolished in the late Spring of 2006, to make room for new housing.

=== Theme song ===
The opening credits theme song for the majority of the show's run was "Next Year" by Foo Fighters, except during the entire second season when Clem Snide's "Moment in the Sun" was used. Season three reverted to "Next Year" in the United States, after resolving the "complicated business reasons" that prevented its use the previous year. "Moment in the Sun" continued to be used outside the U.S., although the end credits list "Next Year" as the opening theme.

A framed Foo Fighters poster hung on the wall of Stuckeyville High School principal Molly Hudson's office.

== Reception ==
=== Critical reception ===
The first season of Ed was met with favorable reviews from critics. On Rotten Tomatoes for the first season it had an approval rating of 83% based on reviews from 24 critics, with an average score of 8.80/10. The site's consensus states: Tom Cavanagh's Ed is ready to try a little tenderness in this sweet-natured romantic comedy that will leave most viewers with a giddy sugar high. Review aggregator website Metacritic, gave the show a score of 87 out of 100 based on 32 reviews. Writing for Entertainment Weekly, Ken Tucker described it as "the best new show of the season...possess[ing] all the bright romantic magic and tart humor of a first-rate screwball film comedy", with particular praise for the performances of Cavanagh and Bowen.

=== Nielsen ratings ===
Season	Timeslot (EDT)	Season premiere	Season finale	TV Season	Rank	Viewers (in millions)
1	Sunday 8:00 P.M. (October 8, 2000 – November 19, 2000); Wednesday 8:00 P.M. (December 6, 2000 – May 23, 2001)	October 8, 2000	May 23, 2001	2000–2001	#52	11.5
2	Wednesday 8:00 P.M. (October 10, 2001 – May 15, 2002)	October 10, 2001	May 15, 2002	2001–2002	#58	9.8
3	Wednesday 8:00 P.M. (September 25, 2002 – March 12, 2003); Friday 9:00 P.M. (March 28 – April 11, 2003)	September 25, 2002	April 11, 2003	2002–2003	#49	10.12
4	Wednesday 8:00 P.M. (September 24, 2003 – January 7, 2004); Friday 9:00 P.M. (January 9 – February 6, 2004)	September 24, 2003	February 6, 2004	2003–2004	#76	8.25

=== Availability ===
The series has never been released on DVD, nor has it been made available on any streaming services. According to series co-creator Rob Burnett, this is in part due to music rights and the show being co-owned by two studios, making it legally harder to get wide distribution. Co-creator Jon Beckerman added: "I had grown to believe that the powers that be didn't have the bandwidth or didn't think there was enough of a way to monetize it to really go for it." Burnett and Beckerman remain hopeful that the series will become available on streaming services in the future.
