= Rob Burnett (producer) =

American film producer and director (born 1962)

- Born: July 8, 1962 (age 63)
- Occupations: Producer, Director and Writer

Rob Burnett (born July 8, 1962) is an American producer, director and writer, best known for being the executive producer of Late Show with David Letterman and as the former president of Worldwide Pants. He is a five-time Emmy award winner, and has received 31 nominations.

Burnett wrote and directed The Fundamentals of Caring starring Paul Rudd, Craig Roberts, and Selena Gomez. The film was received warmly as the closing night film at the Sundance Film Festival and premiered on Netflix as a Netflix Original on June 24, 2016.

Burnett co-created the critically acclaimed show Ed with Jon Beckerman. The show earned the two People's Choice Awards and an Emmy nomination for writing.

In 2008, Burnett received the P.T. Barnum Award from Tufts University for his exceptional work in the field of media and entertainment.

== Biography ==
Burnett grew up in North Caldwell, New Jersey, where he attended West Essex High School. In 1989, Burnett married Eunice Johnson. They have three children: Sydney, Lucy, and Charlie.

Burnett started his television career as an intern for David Letterman in 1985, and later became the head writer for the show in 1992. While acting as head writer, he also helped develop Everybody Loves Raymond. Burnett and Jon Beckerman also created the television comedies Ed and The Knights of Prosperity. Burnett and Beckerman's independent movie We Made This Movie opened in September 2012.

== Filmography ==
Television

Year	Title	Writer	Producer	Creator
1985–1993	Late Night with David Letterman	Yes	No	No
1993–2015	Late Show with David Letterman	Yes	Yes	No
2000–2004	Ed	Yes	Yes	Yes
2007	Knights of Prosperity	Yes	Yes	Yes

Feature film

Year	Title	Director	Writer	Producer
2012	We Made This Movie	Yes	Yes	No
2016	The Fundamentals of Caring	Yes	Yes	No
2026	In Memoriam	Yes	Yes	Yes
