= Jon Beckerman =

American writer, director and producer

Jon Beckerman is a producer, director and writer best known for his projects with Rob Burnett. He was born in 1969. He graduated from Shady Side Academy in 1987 and Harvard University in 1991.

== Career ==
Jon's biggest success has been working with Rob Burnett on Late Show with David Letterman and creating the hit dramedy Ed, as well as the ABC comedy The Knights of Prosperity.
