= 1998–99 United States network television schedule (late night) =

These are the late night schedules for the four United States broadcast networks that offer programming during this time period, from September 1998 to August 1999. All times are Eastern or Pacific. Affiliates will fill non-network schedule with local, syndicated, or paid programming. Affiliates also have the option to preempt or delay network programming at their discretion.

== Legend ==
- Light blue indicates Local programming.
- Gray indicates encore programming.
- Yellow indicates late night talk or variety shows.
- Gold indicates network news programming.

== Schedule ==
=== Monday-Friday ===
Network		11:00 PM	11:35 PM	12:00 AM	12:30 AM	1:00 AM	1:30/1:35 AM	2:00 AM	2:30 AM	3:00 AM	3:30 AM	4:00 AM	4:30 AM	5:00 AM	5:30 AM
ABC		Local Programming	Nightline	Politically Incorrect with Bill Maher (12:07)	Local Programming			ABC World News Now			Local Programming				ABC World News This Morning
CBS	Fall	Local Programming	Late Show with David Letterman		The Late Late Show with Tom Snyder		Local Programming	Up to the Minute		Local Programming					CBS Morning News
CBS	Spring	Local Programming	Late Show with David Letterman		The Late Late Show with Craig Kilborn		Local Programming	Up to the Minute		Local Programming					CBS Morning News
NBC		Local Programming	The Tonight Show with Jay Leno		Late Night with Conan O'Brien		Later (Monday-Thursday); Friday Night (Friday, 1:35-2:35)	Local Programming							NBC News at Sunrise

Note: NBC Nightside was cancelled in September 1998

=== Saturday ===
Network	11:00 PM	11:30 PM	12:00 AM	12:30 AM	1:00 AM	1:30 AM	2:00 AM	2:30 AM	3:00 AM	3:30 AM	4:00 AM	4:30 AM	5:00 AM	5:30 AM
NBC	Local Programming	Saturday Night Live			Local Programming									
Fox	MADtv		Local Programming											

== By network ==
=== ABC ===
Returning series

- ABC World News Now
- ABC World News This Morning
- Nightline
- Politically Incorrect with Bill Maher

Not returning from 1997-98:

- ABC in Concert

=== CBS ===
Returning series

- CBS Morning News
- Late Show with David Letterman
- The Late Late Show with Tom Snyder
- Up to the Minute

New series

- The Late Late Show with Craig Kilborn

=== Fox ===
Returning series

- MADtv

=== NBC ===
Returning series

- Friday Night
- Late Night with Conan O'Brien
- Later
- NBC News at Sunrise
- Saturday Night Live
- The Tonight Show with Jay Leno

Not returning from 1997-98:

- NBC Nightside
