= The Tomorrow Show =

American late-night talk show

- Also known as: Tomorrow with Tom Snyder; Tomorrow Coast to Coast
- Genre: Talk & interview Infotainment; Variety show (1980—1981)
- Presented by: Tom Snyder; Rona Barrett (1980–1981)
- Announcer: Frank Barton (1973–1974); Bill Wendell (1974–1977)
- Country of origin: United States
- Original language: English

Production
- Executive producers: Joel Tator (1973–1975); Pamela Burke (1975–1980); Roger Ailes (1980–1981)
- Producers: Bruce McKay (1973–1974); Sonny Fox; Andy Friendly (1975–1981); Rick Carson (1975–1977); Tom Blomquist (1977–1980); Shelley Ross (1981)
- Production locations: NBC Studios, Burbank, California (1973–1974, 1977–1979); RCA Building, New York City (1974–1977, 1979–1981)
- Running time: 60 minutes (October 15, 1973—September 5, 1980); 90 minutes (September 8, 1980—December 17, 1981)

Original release
- Network: NBC
- Release: October 15, 1973 – December 17, 1981

Related
- Late Night with David Letterman (1982–1993); The Late Late Show with Tom Snyder (CBS; 1995–1999)

The Tomorrow Show (also known as Tomorrow with Tom Snyder or Tomorrow and, after 1980, Tomorrow Coast to Coast) is an American late-night television talk show hosted by Tom Snyder that aired on NBC in first-run form from October 1973 to December 1981, at which point its reruns continued until late January 1982.

Straddling the line between news and entertainment and airing immediately following The Tonight Show Starring Johnny Carson, notable guests of Tomorrow throughout its eight-year run included Ken Kesey, Charles Manson, Spiro Agnew, Harlan Ellison, Alfred Hitchcock, Jimmy Hoffa, Sterling Hayden, David Brenner, and James Baldwin. Unique and often revealing one-on-one exchanges were the program's staple. Since Johnny Carson had mostly abandoned the highbrow, intellectual guests that were common in the early years of his Tonight Show while it originated from New York City (and especially during Jack Paar's hosting run), many of those types of guests—such as social satirist Mort Sahl, actor-activist Marlon Brando, and novelist-philosopher Ayn Rand—eventually ended up on Tomorrow.

Musicians that were featured on the program included The Clash, Jerry Garcia and the Grateful Dead, Kiss, John Lennon (in his last televised interview), Paul McCartney, Public Image Ltd, the Ramones, U2 (in their first American television appearance), Anne Murray, "Weird Al" Yankovic (in his first televised appearance), and Wendy O. Williams and the Plasmatics. Los Angeles news anchor Kelly Lange, a colleague of Snyder, was the regular substitute guest host.

Frank Barton was the show's original announcer when it was based in Burbank; Bill Wendell took over announcing duties when the program moved to New York.

== History and format overview ==
In fall 1973, NBC's decision to launch a nightly program after the Tonight Show was prompted by the 1970 Public Health Cigarette Smoking Act, which banned tobacco advertising on television in the United States, resulting in a loss of revenue for the network. The thinking was that extending the broadcast day by one hour could help recover some of that income. NBC had already begun programming the post-Tonight Show time slot on early Saturdays (late Fridays) with The Midnight Special, which began regular airings (initially brokered) eight months before Tomorrow launched; the success of The Midnight Special was a likely factor in expanding programming in the time slot to five days a week.

Overseeing implementation of the new Monday-to-Thursday nightly program was Herbert Schlosser, the president of NBC television. Schlosser had also had a hand in putting The Midnight Special on NBC eight months prior and had previously spent years as the RCA Corporation-owned television network's vice president for programs on the West Coast. With a job description involving program development among other duties, in the case of launching Tomorrow, Schlosser—reporting to NBC president Julian Goodman—ran into bureaucratic obstacles within the network and in order to try to expedite the internal approval process, on Goodman's advice, decided to leak information about the planned weeknights program to Variety's television beat journalist Les Brown.

The Tomorrow hosting duties were given to local television personality Tom Snyder, who had been working as a news anchor at the network-owned-and-operated KNBC station in Los Angeles, where his colleagues included Tom Brokaw and Bryant Gumbel.

Some ten hours before the program's premiere, NBC organized an afternoon preview screening for journalists and reporters, showing them a mix of already-recorded Tomorrow segments that ostensibly were to air in initial episodes. In addition to Snyder's opening and closing monologues, the reporters saw his panel interview on group marriages. Slight controversy would soon be raised upon realization that neither of the two Snyder monologues the reporters watched at the preview aired the same way in the debut episode that night, with no reasons for the censorship provided by NBC. The censored brief opening monologue reportedly originally featured Snyder somewhat brusquely and impatiently commenting on the Watergate-related "U.S. vice president Spiro Agnew's resignation in disgrace and the questionability of president Richard Nixon's subsequent 'Dear Ted' letter."

Based on the preview screening, New York Times reporter and critic John J. O'Connor referred to Snyder as "baring a personality that is supposed to be brash and abrasive," while in terms of the show's future, the journalist noncommittally concluded, "Tomorrow could turn into the TV version of those radio phone-in shows that work furiously and boringly at being outrageous or it could give the tired format of the TV talk show a desperately needed dose of life.”

=== Debut ===
The show premiered at 1:00 a.m. in the Eastern and Pacific time zones (Midnight Central and Mountain) on Tuesday, October 16, 1973 with a panel discussion on groupies as a social phenomenon and lifestyle choice with three of its adherents, teenage groupies Sable Starr, Queenie Glam, and Chuck, followed by an interview with the second guest, private eye Jay J. Armes. Most sources list the premiere date as "Monday, October 15, 1973", because it was considered part of the NBC's weeknight programming.

The rest of the first week saw Reverend Ike and Billy James Hargis on Tuesday for a general discussion on religion, cult deprogrammer Ted Patrick on Wednesday, and finally the group marriage episode on Thursday with two different real-life "triads"—one featuring two men and a woman and the other with two women and a man.

Established as more of an intimate talk show, Tomorrow differed from Tonight and later late-night fare, with host Snyder conducting one-on-one interviews sans audience, cigarette in hand, no writing staff or scripted pieces, alternating between asking hard-hitting questions and offering personal observations that made the interview closer to a genuine conversation. It was originally broadcast from the NBC Studios in Burbank, California. NBC's Los Angeles station KNBC, where Snyder simultaneously continued working as the evening news anchor, was also located within the facility; Snyder would tape Tomorrow after signing-off from KNBC's 6:00 pm (Pacific time) newscast with the evening tapings usually starting around 7:30 on the same sound stage also used by the Tonight Show. Right after Johnny Carson finished his Tonight taping, crew people would rush in to rearrange the set for Tomorrow. In addition to host Snyder, the Tomorrow staff behind the camera included director and executive producer Joel Tator as well as associate producer Sonny Fox and segment producer Bruce McKay.

As an unproven entity ratings-wise, the show wasn't widely embraced across the network. NBC experienced issues with clearances as many affiliates opted to continue with syndicated reruns or late-night movies, or even to sign-off for the evening instead of carrying first-run Tomorrow; of NBC's then-208 affiliates across the U.S., only between 115-120 carried the show during its first year on the air. Perhaps as a gauge to measure the program's national performance in spite of it being cleared in just over half of the country, a New York Times article published in November 1973 reported that Tomorrow placed second in its time slot in both New York City and Los Angeles, the two largest media markets in the United States—in both cases Tomorrow finished ahead of the ABC affiliate's old movie but behind the CBS station's CBS Late Movie block. Though hardly stellar, Snyder's ratings—3.3 and 3.5 in New York and L.A., respectively—were reportedly still an improvement over the viewership NBC had been attracting in those two markets with the news updates and movies mix in the same time slot before Tomorrow's launch.

Initial reviews were similarly lukewarm. Two weeks into Tomorrow's run, the New York Times television and cultural critic John Leonard, writing under the pen name Cyclops, assessed the new late-night program as "not decided whether it wants to be newspaper, full of headlines and opinions, or a collection of old magazine articles," further stating that "it is neither balm nor shock therapy, it neither entertains nor inspires." Leonard was somewhat kinder to the show's host. Though not rating him quite as high as Dick Cavett, the writer gave Snyder the nod over other popular American talk show hosts of the day: "[Snyder] editorializes with his face—he visibly seethes with opinions—and that is preferable to being permanently dumbfounded, like Merv Griffin, or vaguely resentful, like Johnny Carson, or slightly lobotomized, like David Susskind."

Making the new late-night show work financially became a challenge for NBC due to extremely low prices for commercial spots that a program at 1 a.m. could command. Since, according to Snyder, a 30-second spot on the show brought in only US$3,000 (equivalent to $8,981 in 2025), the network's primary concern initially was cutting production and distribution costs. As satellite transmission was only used for rare special events at the time (the seminal Aloha from Hawaii via Satellite had just unveiled the technology earlier in 1973), the show was sent from coast to coast over the terrestrial microwave facilities (also used for long-distance telephone calls as well as broadcast video & audio at the time) of AT&T Long Lines and it reportedly took NBC the entire first year of Tomorrow broadcasting before they succeeded in getting lower usage tariffs from AT&T.

As decided on and implemented by its director Tator and host Snyder, the show featured distinct visuals during interviews such that, as the conversation progressed, extreme closeup shots of the speaker's face would be shown. The practice would go on to become one of the show's most recognizable traits.

==== Topics covered ====
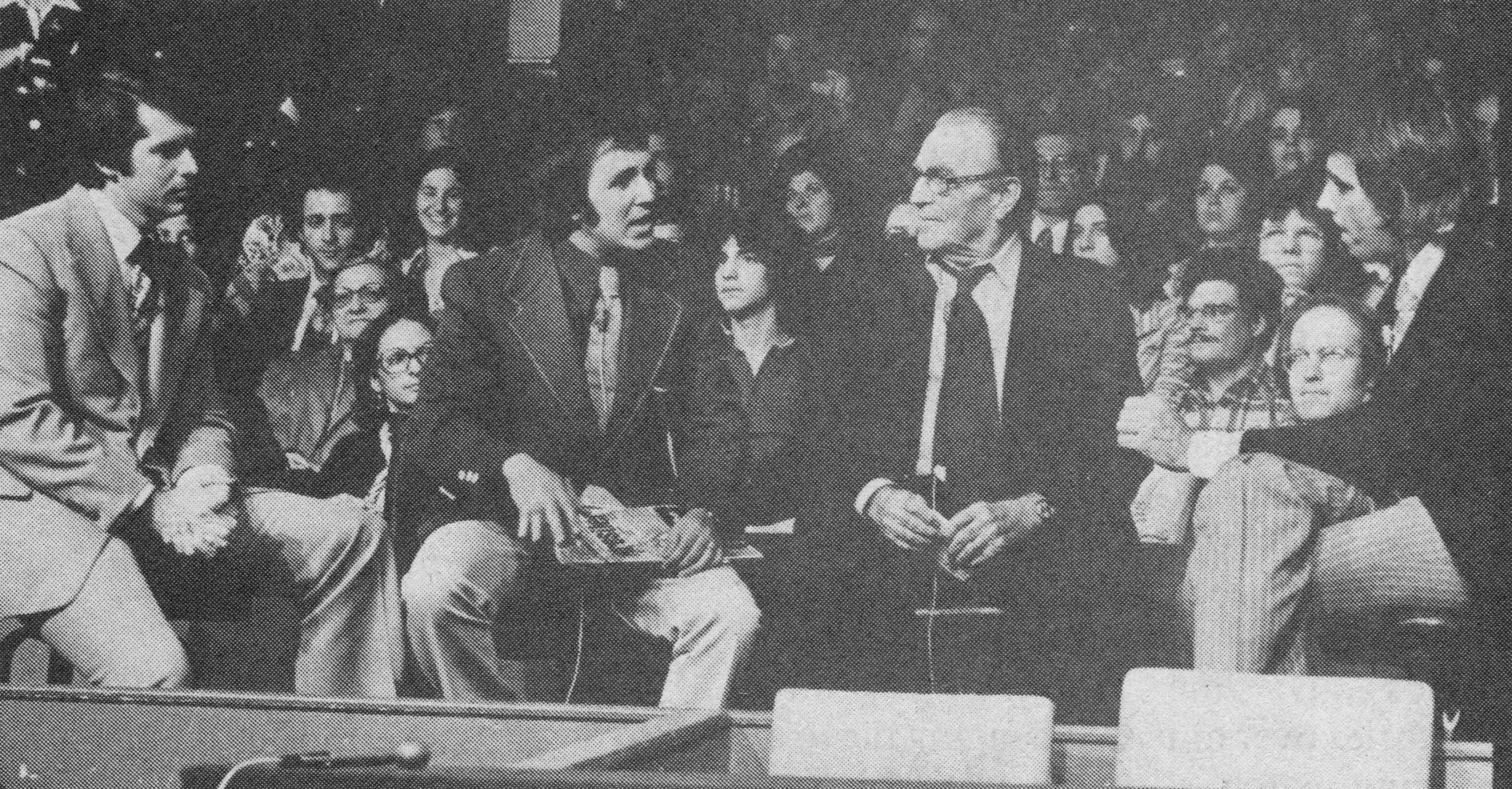
Panel discussion on professional wrestling on the November 5, 1975 program, a topic which received little mainstream attention at the time. From left: Vince McMahon, Bill Apter, Dick Lane and Tom Snyder.

Although eventually best known for hosting writers, authors, film directors, actors, musicians, etc. for in-depth conversations, on most nights during its first year on the air Tomorrow assumed the framing of a news program with newsmagazine-type generalized panel discussions focused around a single social/lifestyle issue or otherwise interesting topic. These included illegitimate children, UFO sightings, suicide, male prostitution, pickup artists, child abuse, race and intelligence, film censorship, bisexuality, witchcraft, Vietnamese orphans fathered by U.S. soldiers, consumerism, lives of single persons, exorcism, police brutality, transsexuals, Bermuda Triangle, gambling, Catholicism in U.S. society, professional team sports, teenage alcoholism, weekly newspapers, trucking, rape, ageing, crime, divorce, cosmetic surgery, etc. as well as on-location shows featuring Snyder's reportages from the Elysium Fields Institute nudist colony in Topanga, California and Tennessee State Penitentiary.

The program also hosted many relatively unusual guests for corporate-owned, nationally-televised American network talk-shows, such as: sixteen-year-old spiritual leader Guru Maharaj Ji, authoritarian Tennessee sheriff Buford Pusser, Playgirl editor Marin Milan, actress Sue Lyon who had just married an imprisoned convict, Grand Dragon of the Ku Klux Klan in Louisiana David Duke, etc. According to Tomorrow associate producer Sonny Fox, the decision to often go after the unconventional, borderline bizarre content was made in part due to the 1 a.m. time slot—with the show's producers feeling that the audience staying up that late would be receptive to a slightly odd subject matter; the decision also had to do with the strict guidelines set by Carson's Tonight Show whose host and producers wanted to ensure that newly-launched Tomorrow has no overlap with their show, limiting its showbiz-adjacent pool of guests to those Carson is not interested in hosting.

Furthermore, being launched in the middle of Watergate, Tomorrow devoted many episodes during its first year to the discussion of this major political scandal in the United States, including having some of its protagonists as guests such as United States Attorney General John N. Mitchell's wife Martha Mitchell. Over the coming years, many of the players in and around the scandal—former U.S. Vice President Spiro Agnew, special prosecutor Leon Jaworski, and U.S. President Richard Nixon's political operatives/advisors Donald Segretti, Charles Colson, and Jeb Stuart Magruder—would end up coming on as guests.

Early into its second season on the air, in late September 1974, it was announced the show would be moving to New York City in December 1974. Primary consideration for the move was transferring Snyder—top-rated local evening news anchor in L.A.—to the WNBC-TV evening news anchor job in New York in order to improve the local newscast's sagging ratings.

The last show from L.A. before moving to New York (although the show would end up returning to California less than three years later) featured Johnny Carson as Snyder's guest for the entire hour on Thursday, November 28, 1974. Well known for his private nature and distant attitude toward the press, the interview features forty-nine-year-old television star Carson looking back on his 1962 start on Tonight, apprehensions about succeeding Jack Paar, and initial decision not to make big changes from Paar's program as well as discussing his focus on comedy and avoidance of using his Tonight as a "sounding board" for political opinions.

=== Move to New York City ===
On December 2, 1974, Tomorrow began to be produced out of the RCA Building at 30 Rockefeller Plaza in New York City, with the first show from New York featuring a packed lineup of guests: New York mayor Abraham Beame, composer Meredith Willson, journalist Gloria Steinem, NBC staff announcer Bill Wendell who simultaneously began announcing for the show going forward, investigative journalist Jimmy Breslin, and stripper Fanne Foxe who had been in the news at the time as the protagonist of a sex scandal involving congressman Wilbur Mills. Concurrently, Snyder took on additional anchor duties for NBC News: with NBC Nightly News on Sundays and on network flagship station WNBC-TV's 6:00 pm weeknight newscast. At WNBC-TV Snyder replaced Jim Hartz, who was promoted by the network as co-anchor of the Today Show.

The weekday tapings of Tomorrow in the RCA Building's Studio 6A would usually start around 7:30 pm (Eastern Time), some thirty minutes after Snyder signed-off WNBC-TV's hour-long 6:00 program. In addition to the personnel that came over from L.A., the show added some new staff—including segment producer Andy Friendly (son of TV veteran Fred Friendly) and Rick Carson (Johnny Carson's son) who began as a segment producer though he would later be promoted to assistant director.

In New York, Tomorrow continued the practice of hour-long in-depth conversations. Labor union leader Jimmy Hoffa made a return appearance on the show in late February 1975. In a topical interview that would end up staying notable beyond its time due to Hoffa's murder/disappearance several months later, the former president of the Teamsters discussed the then current NYPD labor dispute, problems within the garbage worker's union, and the Penn Central situation. He additionally talked about his desire to once again run the Teamsters, his time in prison, and his political views.

==== The John Lennon interview ====
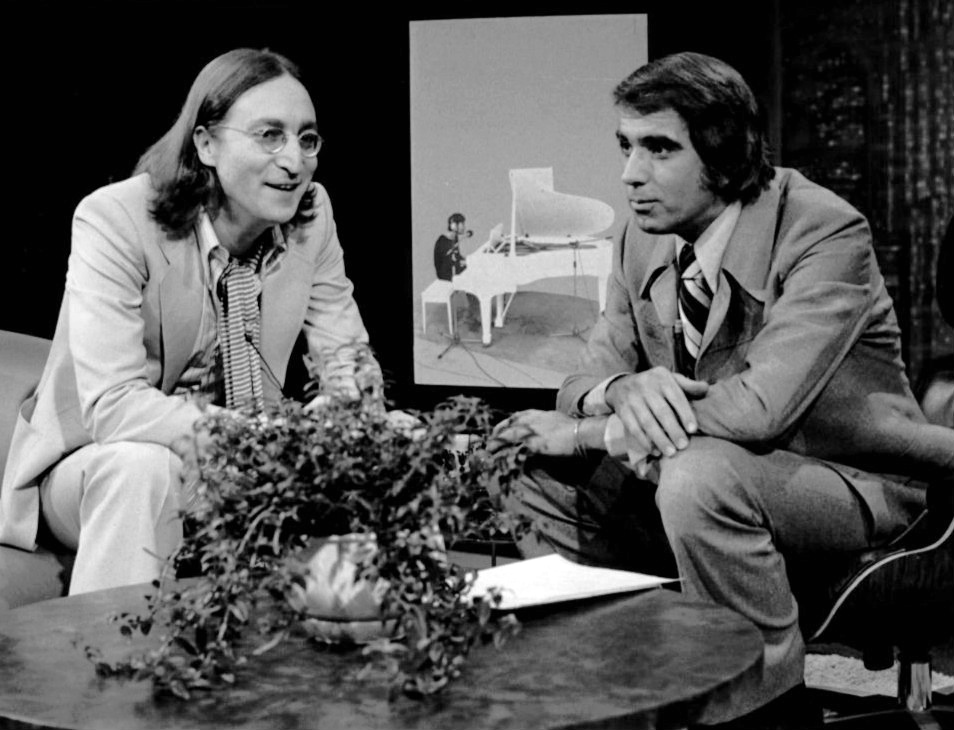
John Lennon talks with Tom Snyder in April 1975

On Monday night, April 28, 1975, Tomorrow aired what eventually became one of its most talked about and enduring moments: John Lennon appeared on the show for the full hour. Recorded twenty days earlier, on April 8, 1975, the interview contains two distinct parts. Since at the time Lennon faced deportation proceedings from America over his 1968 misdemeanour conviction for cannabis possession in London, after the first part of the interview during which Snyder covered regular topics such as the famous 34-year-old's musical career and time with The Beatles, Lennon's legal representative—immigration attorney Leon Wildes—joined Lennon on the panel to discuss the details of the case, as the musician directed his message at the American public in an appeal of sorts to be allowed to remain in the United States.

Lennon's appearance on Tomorrow would gain added significance five and a half years later, in late 1980 when the globally known musician's life was cut short, and it became clear that it was his last televised interview. The night following his murder, the conversation was replayed in its entirety on Tomorrow and soon even released on home video where it became a cult favorite. In addition to stating on the night of its commemorative replay that the interview is "not terrific, not terribly entertaining or enlightening, containing no historical information or anything new," Snyder—frequently asked about the interview throughout the years following Lennon's murder—maintained that "it was not a great one" in his view and that "it would have long since lapsed into obscurity had Lennon not been shot."

By mid-1975, the show managed to establish a distinct personality as well as to demonstrate an ability to post solid and steady viewership ratings that in turn translated into remaining holdout NBC affiliates picking it up at a higher rate. By the end of its second season on the air, Tomorrow was carried by nearly the entire NBC network (196 affiliates out of 208).

==== Saturday Night Live and Dan Aykroyd's impersonation of Snyder ====
NBC occasionally used Tomorrow to plug various holes in its late-night schedule. Following the end of The Best of Carson weekend reruns of the Tonight show, Snyder stepped in to do a special Saturday 11:30 p.m. ninety-minute broadcast of Tomorrow with Jerry Lewis as the only guest on October 4, 1975 because a new program meant to premiere that evening was not ready to launch. Lewis was interviewed for one hour and fifteen minutes, before Snyder brought out the "Not Ready for Prime Time Players" (Gilda Radner, Laraine Newman, Jane Curtin, Dan Aykroyd, Chevy Chase, Garrett Morris, and John Belushi) for the last fifteen minutes of the show so that their boss—show's executive producer Lorne Michaels who did most of the talking—could introduce the debut cast of the network's new sketch series NBC's Saturday Night (the title would not be changed to Saturday Night Live until 1977) to the national audience.

Not long after the launch of SNL, Tomorrow moved from the RCA Building's Studio 6A to Studio 8G, down the hall from SNL's famous Studio 8H.

When not grilling guests, Snyder would often joke around with off-stage crewmen, frequently breaking out in the distinctively hearty laugh that became the basis for Dan Aykroyd's impersonation of Snyder on Saturday Night Live, which the comedian first did in April 1976. Audience's positive reaction would lead to Aykroyd doing ten more Snyder sketches on SNL over the following three years. Further lampooned in the sketches were the Tomorrow host's seemingly mismatched jet-black eyebrows and grey hair in addition to his mercurial manner and self-indulgent, digressive way of asking questions as well as his clipped speech pattern. Being the subject of satire on the highly-rated sketch-variety show greatly raised Snyder's profile; due to SNL having a much larger audience than Tomorrow, many viewers saw the impression before knowing the man's own work.

With a cult following on Tomorrow, strong evening news numbers on NBC’s flagship affiliate in New York, and now the popular impersonation being seen by millions further increasing his prominence, Snyder was beginning to get a lot of press attention through the lens of speculation about his future on NBC. Possible career paths such as succeeding Johnny Carson on the Tonight Show, going straight to Today, or replacing John Chancellor on NBC Nightly News were regularly bandied about in the American national press. Though recognizing that being the basis for a popular sendup on SNL helped make a number of viewers aware of Snyder and Tomorrow, some observers were of the opinion that, in retrospect, the launch of SNL (particularly its rapid success with younger viewers, where Tomorrow often struggled) was, in many ways, also the beginning of the end for Tomorrow. Though being content with Tomorrow's overall viewership numbers, in the wake of SNL's successful launch, NBC brass suddenly also began looking for Snyder to attract more of the coveted 18-to-34-year-old demographic. This overall desire on the network's part would soon lead to Tomorrow being gradually infused with more entertainment elements.

A testament to its popularity, after Aykroyd's departure from SNL in 1979, the Snyder impersonation would be taken over by incoming cast member Harry Shearer. Incidentally, Shearer had been impersonating Snyder years before he ever got to SNL as member of The Credibility Gap radio comedy troupe in Los Angeles; Snyder, who was made aware of Shearer's impression of him in 1975, even invited the group to tape a five-minute video segment—featuring Shearer as Snyder interviewing two CIA operatives played by David Lander and Michael McKean—that got shown on Tomorrow in 1975, a full year before Aykroyd debuted his Snyder impression on SNL. Due to being on the show for only a season, Shearer would end up doing the impression on SNL only once, in February 1980. An impression of Snyder was also done on SCTV by Dave Thomas in December 1980. Back on SNL, when Shearer left, the Snyder impression was taken over by Joe Piscopo who would end up doing it seven times from late 1981 until February 1984, well beyond Tomorrow's cancellation.

Furthermore, Snyder was the inspiration for the cartoon "Tom Morrow", which appeared in Playboy in the late 1970s.

On April 25–28, 1977, the beginning of sweeps, Tomorrow was in Chicago for a week of shows from Drury Lane Theatre featuring a lineup of Chicago-related personalities as guests, including former Bears quarterback Bobby Douglass, Bears owner George Halas, White Sox sportscaster Harry Caray, White Sox owner Bill Veeck, Sun-Times columnist Irv Kupcinet, actor Forrest Tucker, broadcaster Paul Harvey, comedienne Fran Allison, puppeteer Burr Tillstrom, and author-broadcaster Studs Terkel.

=== Return to Los Angeles ===
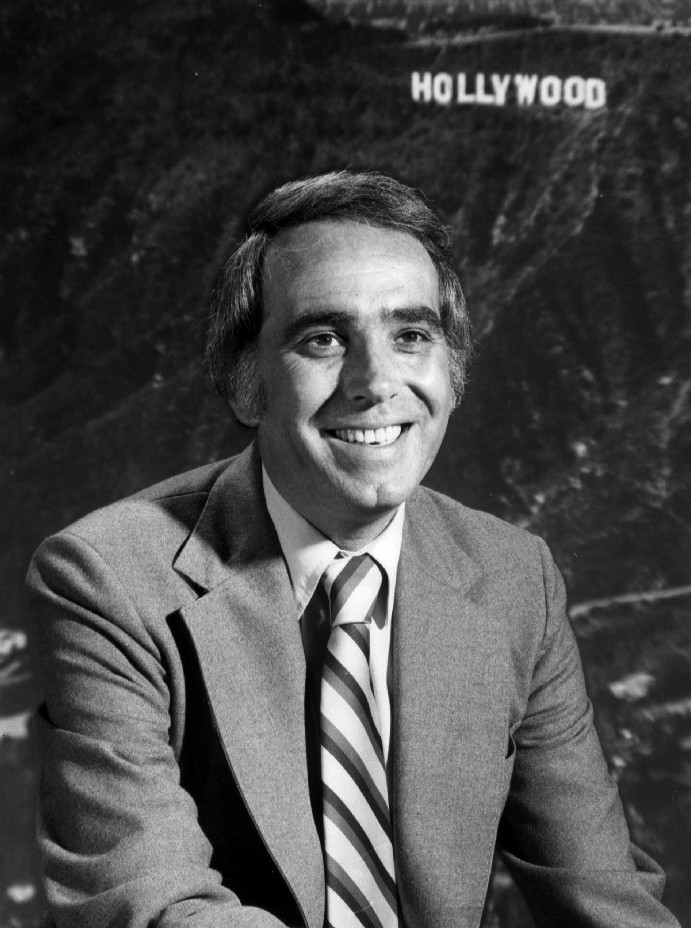
Snyder on set of the program in 1977

On Monday, June 6, 1977, the show returned to Burbank with California governor Jerry Brown as the only guest for the hour. This time around in California, Snyder was free of local news anchoring duties, devoting his full attention to Tomorrow that, just like previously from 1973 until 1974, went back to being taped in NBC Studios' studio 1, which also housed Johnny Carson's Tonight show.

As part of the promotional activities surrounding Tomorrow's return to Burbank, on June 7, 1977, Snyder appeared on the Tonight show for the very first time. Coming out as Carson’s second guest on the night, after actress Suzanne Pleshette, the Tomorrow host talked about his show’s return to the building it had been launched from, his career in broadcasting, and even addressed press reports of supposed discord between him and Carson, playfully dismissing them.

Snyder would let his flamboyant side take over from time to time such as a 1978 show when he had on one of NBC's West Coast staff announcers, Donald Rickles, one day after interviewing the same-named comedian Don Rickles. During the course of their segment, Snyder and Rickles (the announcer) spent ten minutes playing the then-new electronic game, Simon.

On May 25, 1978, Snyder hosted a three-person panel of young comedians and comedy writers—31-year-old David Letterman and his 29-year-old girlfriend Merrill Markoe, as well as 30-year-old Billy Crystal—each of whom had recently moved to Hollywood in search of a career in show business, appearing on Tomorrow on this occasion to discuss their lives as struggling comics. Pitched to Tomorrow executive producers by one of the show's segment producers, Andy Friendly, and booked by him through comedy talent manager Buddy Morra, the episode was originally supposed to feature Letterman, Crystal, and Robin Williams—three of the hottest young stand-up comics as recommended by Morra—however, due to 26-year-old Williams' highly disengaged pre-interview with listless and monosyllabic answers, segment producer Friendly decided to un-book him, opting for Letterman's girlfriend Markoe instead. For future television star Letterman, this appearance marked his U.S. national television debut. The encounter on the show would prove significant for Snyder's own future television career prospects as it marked the beginning of his acquaintance with Letterman that over subsequent two decades evolved into friendship and even business relationship.

In early April 1979, Tomorrow's upcoming June move back to New York City was announced as part of Snyder's new contract with NBC. Simultaneously with continuing on Tomorrow, the broadcaster signed on to host Prime Time Sunday, a new weekly newsmagazine set to air Sundays at 9 p.m. on NBC, also beginning in June, thus marking his return to NBC's news division following more than two years of solely hosting Tomorrow. In order to accommodate the launch of Snyder's new prime time newsmagazine, NBC further announced plans of moving its existing Weekend newsmagazine from Sundays as the program had been suffering from low ratings ever since being moved to Sundays in the first place. The host additionally agreed to do three celebrity interview prime time specials for NBC's entertainment division throughout the 1979-80 season. The new deal—that would see Snyder receive US$1 million (equivalent to $4,436,039 in 2025) in annual compensation from NBC—reportedly came following two-year negotiations between the network and Snyder's Hollywood agent Ed "The Hook" Hookstratten. With the announcement of the relocation of Tomorrow's production back to New York, as well as the launch of his new prime time program, Snyder was the subject of a lengthy Washington Post profile by influential television critic Tom Shales with discussion of the seeming dichotomy within the broadcaster's career—being both a newsman and a showman—dominating the piece.

==== Relationship with Johnny Carson ====
The last show from the second stint in Burbank aired on Thursday, May 31, 1979 with the Tonight show sidekick Ed McMahon and Regis Philbin as the only guests for the full hour. The next night, Snyder went on Tonight in a sendoff of sorts before leaving for New York. Though the two NBC late-night hosts appeared on each other's shows—and furthermore had a connection through Carson's son Rick who worked on Snyder's show—a number of reports in the U.S. national press about Carson and Snyder not being on good terms kept appearing over the years.

Snyder himself occasionally hinted at there being quiet hostility, such as when, seemingly bitterly, he told viewers in 1995, during the debut episode of his Late Late Show on CBS while thanking his lead-in David Letterman for generously promoting his show, that in nearly nine years of doing the Tomorrow show on NBC, he never once heard Carson say, "Stay tuned for Tom Snyder" at the end of the Tonight Show. The claims were further substantiated in a 2013 Carson memoir by Carson’s lawyer and close confidante of eighteen years Henry Bushkin who states that Carson disliked Snyder for a long time, finding him "talentless and boring based on nothing but [Snyder's] performances on TV." Furthermore, according to Bushkin, on one particular occasion during the late 1970s, an inebriated Carson—having dinner at Chasen's restaurant in West Hollywood with a party of friends that included his wife Joanna, Ed McMahon, Ed’s wife Victoria, and Bushkin—even attempted to physically accost Snyder after spotting him eating dinner by himself at another table, approaching it, and lunging for his throat before getting restrained and separated by McMahon.

=== Back in New York City: Prime time Snyder ===
On Monday, June 18, 1979, Snyder's Tomorrow once again began originating from New York with broadcaster Howard K. Smith as guest for the hour. This time around in New York City, Snyder would work on three prominent fronts for NBC: the late-night show as well as two prime time programs—a weekly one for NBC News and a three-instalment celebrity special featuring a total of twelve celebrity interviews for NBC Entertainment.

From the beginning of its second New York stint, the title card on Snyder's late-night show featured dovetailed "Tom" and "Tomorrow" by highlighting "Tom" in a different color.

Snyder's new prime time newsmagazine Prime Time Sunday debuted on June 24, 1979 at 10 p.m. to a highly respectable 15.5 viewership rating, significant improvement over the 10.6 rating the show it replaced, Weekend, had been posting. In addition to anchor Snyder conducting his interviews live, the show featured taped pieces by correspondents Chris Wallace and Jack Perkins.

Tomorrow's guests supplied the program with unconventional moments such as an August 1979 appearance by the 24-year-old Chicago shock-jock Steve Dahl who had gained national attention in the United States earlier that summer for taking part in Disco Demolition Night promotion at a White Sox game at Comiskey Park.

By October 1979, Prime Time Sunday had added more contributors, including young correspondent Jessica Savitch who, in addition to working on Prime Time Sunday, filled in for Snyder on Tomorrow for the week of September 17.

==== The interviews ====
The same year on Halloween, perhaps the most outrageous interview seen on Snyder's show occurred when the rock band Kiss appeared in promotion of their new album, Dynasty. During the 25-minute interview, conversation degenerated into a somewhat chaotic exchange between Snyder and a very drunk Ace Frehley who picked up Snyder's teddy bear, put the wristlets from his costume on the bear, and laughed, "the only Spacebear in captivity! I've got him — he's captured!" When Snyder asked Ace if his costume was some sort of spaceman, Frehley quipped, "No, actually I'm a plumber." Snyder shot back, "Well, I've got a piece of pipe backstage I'd like to have you work on." The inebriated Frehley replied "Tell me about it!" and clapped his hands and cackled hysterically at the exchange. Years later, Gene Simmons revealed on his website that he felt "betrayed" by the other band members during this interview. Shortly thereafter, drummer Peter Criss officially left the band and subsequently appeared on the show, making Snyder the first host to have a member of Kiss appearing without makeup in public.

NBC moved Prime Time Sunday to Saturdays on December 29, 1979, renaming it Prime Time Saturday without any further changes to the program's structure or personnel.

Another run-in Snyder had with petulant rock stars on Tomorrow occurred on June 27, 1980 in a cigarette-smoke-filled appearance of Public Image Ltd's John Lydon (aka Johnny Rotten) and Keith Levene, whose thoroughly uncooperative twelve-minute interview on the show acquired a long-term notoriety. Snyder called it "one dumb moment of television," but TV Guide listed it among the 10 greatest rock and roll moments in the history of television.

As stipulated in his contract with NBC, Snyder did multiple celebrity interview specials in 1979 and 1980. Named Tom Snyder's Celebrity Spotlight and airing in prime time at 10 p.m., the first one saw Snyder interview Cher, Jack Lemmon, Loni Anderson, and Chevy Chase. Other installments saw him interview Clint Eastwood, James Cagney, Carroll O'Connor, and Bo Derek.

The final installment of Snyder's weekly Prime Time Saturday newsmagazine aired in early July 1980 amid Snyder's fraught relationship with NBC News president William J. Small that, according to Snyder's own words, resulted in the anchor being "thrown out of NBC News". The cancelled weekend newsmagazine would, from late September 1980, be replaced with NBC Magazine anchored by David Brinkley with many of the same individuals that previously worked with Snyder on Prime Time Saturday now continuing with Brinkley, such as executive producer Paul Friedman and correspondent Jack Perkins.

Meanwhile, during months-long early 1980 contract negotiations with their top-earning personality Johnny Carson—in anticipation of likely having to budge on his demands of reducing the Tonight Show's runtime down to one hour—NBC brass began preparing changes to their late-night lineup by placing Saturday Night Live producer Lorne Michaels's recently established production company Broadway Video in charge of developing a new thirty-minute nightly show. Tentatively named Yesterday, it was to roughly follow the expanded format of SNL's Weekend Update segment, be produced by Herb Sargent, and be placed in the 12:30 a.m. time slot between Tonight and Tomorrow. However, in May 1980, with Carson finally signing a new contract that gave him control of the time slot immediately following his Tonight show, plans for Yesterday were abandoned. Instead, the network decided to fill the extra thirty minutes by extending Tomorrow to ninety minutes.

=== Retooling the format: 90 minutes, studio audience, Rona Barrett ===
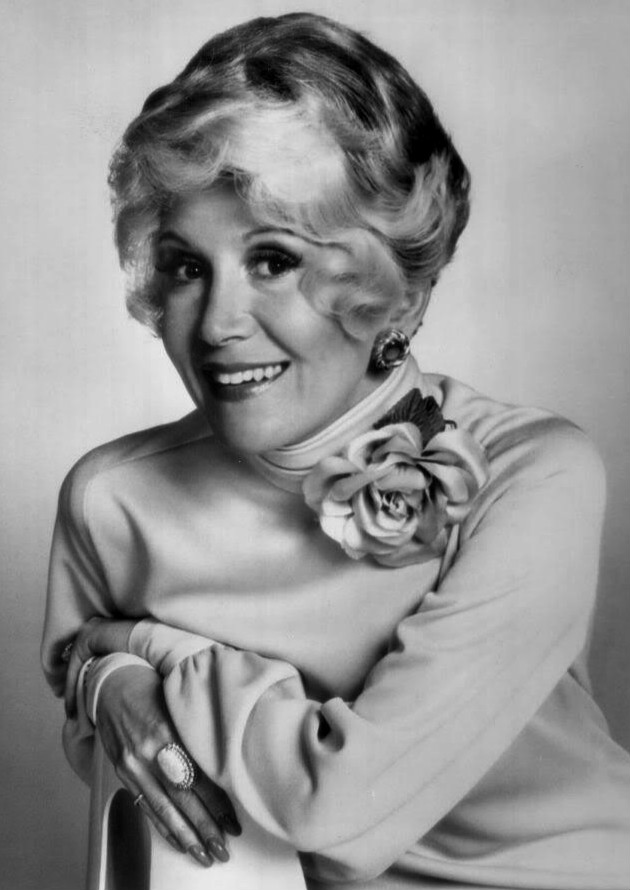
Rona Barrett (seen here in 1975) briefly co-hosted the show from October 1980 to June 1981

In the late summer of 1980—as a consequence of Johnny Carson's out-of-court-settled legal battle with NBC over the terms of his contract that led to the powerful and authoritative host finally succeeding in scaling The Tonight Show down to an hour (something that he had been petitioning NBC for years)—Tomorrow's starting time was moved half an hour earlier to 12:30 a.m. while its run time expanded to 90 minutes. To fill the extra 30 minutes, based on the decision of NBC president Fred Silverman, Tomorrow would become a more typical entertainment talk show: taped in front of a live studio audience, having live musical performances, along with the addition of gossip reporter Rona Barrett as co-host. Snyder resented all three changes, repeating his often stated discomfort with doing "big television", instead preferring the intimate setting that allows real conversation as well as sincere and genuine personal moments to take place. He also felt live audiences turn up at TV shows for specific reasons such as winning prizes or getting uproarious laughs, and since Tomorrow provided neither, he thought them entirely unnecessary on his program.

The first episode in the new time slot aired on September 8, 1980 with Snyder interviewing Rona Barrett as guest and announcing her arrival on the show on October 27, 1980, presenting it as "adding somebody who would be able to report on the many facets of the entertainment industry around the country and all over the world." In actuality, earlier that year, NBC had managed to lure Barrett away from her prominent on-air correspondent position at ABC's Good Morning America with an offer of joining the rival Today show on NBC along with additional programming opportunities across the NBC television network, one of which turned out to be getting attached as co-host to the Tomorrow late-night show as part of its major overhauling.

As a consequence of its changed starting time and uncertainty over its ratings performance, certain NBC affiliates began dropping the show, most notably Group W-owned sister stations KYW-TV in Philadelphia (where Snyder had worked as a popular local news anchor and talk show host earlier) and WBZ-TV in Boston, both of which replaced the program with reruns of Hawaii Five-O.

Once Barrett joined in late October 1980, the program began alternating between Snyder, who was in New York City interviewing general interest guests, and Hollywood-based Barrett filing entertainment reports and/or talking to celebrity guests. As part of the promotion of her arrival on Tomorrow, Barrett appeared on the Tonight Show for the first time, sitting down with Johnny Carson as the show's second guest on the night.

Co-hosts Snyder and Barrett developed a frosty and antagonistic relationship almost immediately. Snyder refused to acknowledge Barrett as co-host—referring to her only as a "correspondent" or "reporter"—while further not allowing her segment to lead the show even on occasions when she had a major celebrity interview. Seeing Snyder frustrated with sharing the spotlight with the high-profile entertainment television personality and Barrett unhappy over her marginalized status on the program despite officially being its co-host, NBC responded by hiring a new executive producer, 40-year-old former Nixon presidential campaign staffer Roger Ailes, tasking him with controlling the co-anchors the network believed were being petty and immature. Bringing Ailes in meant the removal of existing executive producer, Snyder's live-in girlfriend Pamela Burke, which further angered the host.

Following John Lennon's murder on December 8, 1980, his 1975 Tomorrow interview with Snyder was replayed in its entirety the following night on the show. Introducing the five-year-old interview about to be replayed, Snyder referred to it as "not terrific, not terribly entertaining or enlightening, containing no historical information or anything new, but having little bits of stuff and substance of a man who was part of change, a revolution if you will, in popular music during the 1960s."

==== Barrett walks off and returns, Tomorrow Coast to Coast ====
The relationship between the two co-hosts soon turned into an open feud; in late December 1980, Barrett even walked off the show as a result of Snyder refusing to "throw it to her" by not introducing her entertainment segment during a Tomorrow taping. By early January 1981, Barrett was persuaded to return to the show whose name was changed to Tomorrow Coast to Coast with an adapted instrumental version of Dan Hartman's "Relight My Fire" as its new opening theme. Executive producer Ailes' plan was to make Tomorrow Coast to Coast into a talk-variety show and build up its audience by slotting regular, reoccurring features into it when viewers can expect to see them.

The network wanted the show to attract younger viewers and thus started booking younger musical and entertainment acts for interviews followed by performances. They would on occasion cross over into bizarre territory such as a March 1981 appearance by the punk band Plasmatics during which lead singer Wendy O. Williams sledgehammered a TV set in the studio during their performance. The TV's explosion disrupted a live broadcast of NBC Nightly News with anchor John Chancellor being produced in a studio two floors above them. Snyder himself referred to this occurrence when interviewing Williams during the band's May 1981 follow-up appearance in which she spray-painted and later blew up a Chevrolet Nova with a lit firecracker.

As revealed in the January 2018-released FBI files on Roger Ailes, during the same early 1981 period, recently inaugurated U.S. president Ronald Reagan's would-be assassin John Hinckley Jr. was found in possession of a pair of tickets to the March 2, 1981 taping of Tomorrow Coast to Coast. The FBI files further reveal that on April 3, 1981—four days after Hinckley's attempt on Reagan's life—Ailes was interviewed by FBI agents who were particularly interested in whether the March 2 show guest list featured either Jodie Foster or Robert De Niro due to Hinckley's by-then known obsession with the two Taxi Driver stars. The files reveal that Ailes provided information about the March 2 Tomorrow Coast to Coast guests being comedian Pat Cooper, Mafia expert and former NYPD detective Ralph Salerno, and singer Leo Sayer; the FBI agents were further given a videotape of the March 2 show but were unable to confirm Hinckley's presence at said taping of the show.

"Weird Al" Yankovic's first television appearance was on the April 21, 1981 installment of the show, where he performed "Another One Rides the Bus". In June 1981, Irish rock band U2's first American television appearance took place on Tomorrow Coast to Coast.

==== The Charles Manson interview ====
In an effort to attract more viewers, NBC turned to spectacle television. On Friday, June 12, 1981, as a special edition of Tomorrow Coast to Coast, a 53-minute edit of Snyder's prison interview with mass murderer Charles Manson aired, reportedly secured by Ailes via a "US$10,000-consultation fee" paid to Manson's former prison buddy Nuel Emmons who had been looking to monetize his access to Manson in addition to seeking a publisher for his book on the convicted murderer. Recorded six days earlier on June 6 at the California Medical Facility in Vacaville where he was being incarcerated, Manson was by turns quietly mesmerizing and disturbingly manic, suddenly getting a wild look in his eyes and spouting wild notions at Snyder before temporarily returning to a calm demeanor. In keeping with the singular event nature of the broadcast, the day before the interview was set to air, NBC organized a special screening for journalists followed by a press conference where Snyder and Ailes took questions from the thirty gathered reporters. Snyder stated on the occasion that "interviews with Charles Manson don't grow on trees, I was there when the tree opened up," while adding that "there's not one person in this room who wouldn't have done this interview." The host further revealed that the interview was edited to "eliminate many repetitions due to Manson's tendency to wander in conversation."

Though it brought the show a huge ratings number (22.2 million viewers instead of its customary 6.9), Snyder would eventually publicly voice his reservations about the appearance, expressing in a later interview that it "established absolutely nothing, other than what was already well known—that Manson is a nutcase."

Decades later, in spring 2017, in the wake of Roger Ailes' resignation from Fox News amid allegations of sexual harassment, a Hollywood production company announced development of a film project about the events surrounding Manson's 1981 interview on Tomorrow Coast to Coast.

==== Barrett quits for good ====
The uneasy six-month truce between feuding co-hosts Snyder and Barrett soon crumbled as Barrett quit the series on June 16, 1981, explaining her decision via a brief interview with the United Press International news agency: "My part in the show wasn't what it was originally conceived to be. It's a long and complicated problem. I agreed to attempt the new format with Tom Snyder at the request of [NBC president] Fred Silverman, but it's never turned into what I thought it was going to be or what my contract stated." She further stated that since her January 1981 return to the show following a prior walk-off in protest, her portions of the program had been relegated to the final half-hour of the 90-minute show, specifically bringing up that even her interview with Reverend Billy Graham couldn't get her a lead. Barrett concluded by saying that she and Snyder are "philosophically miles apart" and adding, "I wish him all the luck in the world but I won't play second fiddle to him or anybody else any longer."

Snyder had no comment while Ailes offered a generic statement: "I deeply regret her leaving but I believe that people ought to be where they want to be in life. Rona feels she has paid her dues and earned her stripes and that she should have her own show. She is very good at what she does and I appreciate her point of view". Barrett's decision made major news in the U.S. television entertainment circles, including Johnny Carson mentioning it the same night in his Tonight Show monologue via a joke that "Snyder's already found a replacement for Rona—Charles Manson".

In the immediate aftermath of her acrimonious departure from Tomorrow, Barrett mostly steered clear of publicly going into details of her feud with Snyder, either dismissing the questions completely or only offering vague comments. Asked about it by Johnny Carson during her July 22, 1981 Tonight Show appearance promoting her upcoming celebrity special, Barrett responded with a 'no comment'; when journalist and TV critic Tom Shales brought it up in a late 1981 Washington Post interview, she commented that it would require a "longer analytical response than just saying that ‘Tom Snyder is a son of a bitch’," before clarifying she doesn't feel that way about him and adding she has “lots of feelings about Snyder, some of which are very sad.” Asked by a New York Times reporter if Barrett or Snyder was more responsible for the malicious breakup, an anonymous NBC executive was quoted as responding, “That's like asking if you'd rather die of a heart attack or cancer.”

Over the subsequent years and decades, Barrett got more direct in her comments about Snyder—accusing him of bad workplace treatment by saying “terrible things” to her and being part of an old boys network; she further claimed that after she had joined Tomorrow Snyder got very jealous when the ratings started to go up and that he was a “big drinker”.

==== Snyder the sole host again, ratings drop, and cancellation ====
With Barrett out, Snyder returned to being the only host on July 6, 1981. Entertainment reports were eliminated from the show, but the series kept the title Tomorrow Coast to Coast, essentially reverting to one-on-one interviews while retaining the live studio audience and musical guests. However, the ratings fell quickly and, by early October 1981, several major-market NBC affiliates—in Boston (WBZ-TV), Philadelphia (KYW-TV), and Minneapolis–St. Paul (WTCN-TV)—ceased carrying the show. Within a month, NBC pulled the plug.

All told, Tomorrow lasted only fourteen months in its 90-minute variety show format and less than a year with the Coast to Coast name. Among the terms of Carson's 1980 agreement to stay with NBC was that he would gain control of the time slot following The Tonight Show. On November 9, 1981, NBC and Carson's production company Carson Productions announced the creation of a new program starring David Letterman, tentatively referred to as The David Letterman Show like the comedian's cancelled morning show, set to premiere in early 1982 in the 12:30 a.m. slot Monday through Thursday. Within weeks, the program's name—Late Night with David Letterman—would be announced as well. NBC offered Snyder the opportunity to continue as host of Tomorrow in the 1:30 to 2:30 a.m. slot following Letterman, but the 45-year-old broadcaster refused—feeling that 1:30 in the morning is "just too late" for the kind of broadcast he's interested in doing—and the show was cancelled. Even after passing on the 1:30 a.m. slot, there was still a small chance of Snyder remaining with NBC by getting internally re-assigned to the network's news division; however—due to his stock at NBC News being low since the unceremonious end of his Prime Time Sunday/Saturday a year earlier and the broadcaster reportedly not being on good terms with NBC News president William J. Small—it never came to pass. Instead, NBC ended up releasing Snyder by buying out the rest of his US$600,000 per year contract that ran through September 1982.

The last first-run Tomorrow Coast to Coast aired Thursday, December 17, 1981, with Snyder's old favorite Chevy Chase as the final guest; Chase famously criticized the network during the broadcast for cancelling the show. Chase's segment was followed by earlier guest Peter Allen performing his song "I'd Rather Leave While I'm in Love". Reruns subsequently aired through Thursday, January 28, 1982.

The 1:30 a.m. slot Snyder had been offered was given to NBC News Overnight in July 1982. In 1988, NBC launched in that slot, Later with Bob Costas, a half-hour long-form interview show with a similar format to Tomorrow; Snyder occasionally guest-hosted.

David Letterman and Snyder already had a history together: a 1978 Tomorrow episode hosted by Snyder was almost exclusively devoted to a long interview with up-and-coming comedy talents Letterman, Billy Crystal, and Merrill Markoe. Two years later on September 22, 1980, Letterman (then winding down his morning program on NBC) appeared once more on Tomorrow (now in its new 90-minute format with studio audience). The two remained on good terms even after Letterman took over Snyder's 12:30 a.m. slot on NBC. Letterman often expressed his admiration for Snyder's style and would occasionally call in to Snyder's radio show on ABC Radio/NBC Talknet and his television CNBC talk show during the late 1980s and early 1990s. In 1995, Letterman handpicked Snyder to host a late night talk show following his Late Show on CBS: The Late Late Show, produced by Letterman's Worldwide Pants Incorporated. Snyder hosted the show until March 26, 1999, after which he was succeeded by Craig Kilborn.

== Awards and nominations ==
The show was nominated for three Emmy Awards: one in 1976 for Outstanding Achievement in Technical Direction and Electronic Camerawork and two in 1981 for Special Classification of Outstanding Program and Individual Achievement.

== DVD releases ==
Three DVD compilations of footage of The Tomorrow Show have been released by Shout! Factory to date:

The Tomorrow Show – Tom Snyder's Electric Kool-Aid Talk Show

A compilation featuring interviews with 1960s counterculture figures.

- The Grateful Dead
- Ken Kesey
- Timothy Leary
- Tom Wolfe

The Tomorrow Show with Tom Snyder – Punk & New Wave

A compilation of punk rock and new wave acts that appeared on the show.

- Elvis Costello
- The Jam
- Joan Jett
- John Lydon
- The Plasmatics
- Iggy Pop
- Ramones
- Patti Smith
- Paul Weller

The Tomorrow Show with Tom Snyder – John, Paul, Tom & Ringo

Three whole shows on which former members of The Beatles appeared. (The compilation title refers to the absence of George Harrison, who never appeared on Tomorrow.)

- Part 1
  - John Lennon
  - Leon Wildes (Lennon's immigration attorney)
  - Lisa Robinson (journalist)
  - Jack Douglas
- Part 2 (Wings)
  - Paul McCartney
  - Linda McCartney
  - Denny Laine
  - Laurence Juber
- Part 3
  - Ringo Starr
  - Barbara Bach
  - Angie Dickinson

== See also ==
- List of late-night American network TV programs
