= 1997–98 United States network television schedule (late night) =

These are the late night schedules for the four United States broadcast networks that offer programming during this time period, from September 1997 to August 1998. All times are Eastern or Pacific. Affiliates will fill non-network schedule with local, syndicated, or paid programming. Affiliates also have the option to preempt or delay network programming at their discretion.

== Legend ==
- Light blue indicates Local programming.
- Gray indicates encore programming.
- Yellow indicates late night talk or variety shows.
- Gold indicates network news programming.

== Schedule ==
=== Monday-Friday ===
Network	11:00 PM	11:35 PM	12:00 AM	12:30 AM	1:00 AM	1:30/1:35 AM	2:00 AM	2:30 AM	3:00 AM	3:30 AM	4:00 AM	4:30 AM	5:00 AM	5:30 AM
ABC	Local Programming	Nightline	Politically Incorrect with Bill Maher (12:07)	ABC in Concert (Friday)	Local Programming		ABC World News Now			Local Programming				ABC World News This Morning
CBS	Local Programming	Late Show with David Letterman		The Late Late Show with Tom Snyder		Local Programming	Up to the Minute		Local Programming					CBS Morning News
NBC	Local Programming	The Tonight Show with Jay Leno		Late Night with Conan O'Brien		Later (Monday-Thursday); Friday Night (Friday, 1:35-2:35)	NBC Nightside			Local Programming				NBC News at Sunrise

=== Saturday ===
Network	11:00 PM	11:30 PM	12:00 AM	12:30 AM	1:00 AM	1:30 AM	2:00 AM	2:30 AM	3:00 AM	3:30 AM	4:00 AM	4:30 AM	5:00 AM	5:30 AM
NBC	Local Programming	Saturday Night Live			Local Programming									
Fox	MADtv		Local Programming											

== By network ==
=== ABC ===
Returning series

- ABC in Concert
- ABC World News Now
- ABC World News This Morning
- Nightline
- Politically Incorrect with Bill Maher

=== CBS ===
Returning series

- CBS Morning News
- Late Show with David Letterman
- The Late Late Show with Tom Snyder
- Up to the Minute

=== Fox ===
Returning series

- MADtv

=== NBC ===
Returning series

- Friday Night
- Late Night with Conan O'Brien
- Later
- NBC News at Sunrise
- NBC Nightside
- Saturday Night Live
- The Tonight Show with Jay Leno
