= Late Show with David Letterman =

American late-night talk show (1993–2015)

- Also known as: Late Show (franchise brand)
- Genre: Late-night talk show; Variety show; Comedy
- Created by: David Letterman
- Written by: Rob Burnett (1993–96); Joe Toplyn (1996–98); Rodney Rothman (1998–2000); Justin Stangel and Eric Stangel (2000–13); Matt Roberts (2013–15)
- Presented by: David Letterman
- Announcer: Bill Wendell (1993–95); Alan Kalter (1995–2015)
- Music by: Paul Shaffer and the CBS Orchestra (house band)
- Opening theme: "Late Show Theme"
- Composer: Paul Shaffer
- Country of origin: United States
- Original language: English
- No. of seasons: 23
- No. of episodes: 4,262 (list of episodes)

Production
- Executive producers: Robert Morton (1993–96); Peter Lassally (1993–96); Eric Stangel (2000–11); Justin Stangel (2000–11); Matt Roberts (2002–15); Brian Teta (2004–15); Rob Burnett (1996–2015); Barbara Gaines (2000–15); Maria Pope (2000–15); Jude Brennan (2003–15)
- Production locations: Ed Sullivan Theater; New York, New York
- Camera setup: Multi-camera
- Running time: 62 minutes (with commercials)
- Production companies: Worldwide Pants; CBS Television Studios (Note: Credited as CBS Entertainment Productions (1993–95), CBS Productions (1995–2006) and CBS Paramount Network Television (2006–09).)

Original release
- Network: CBS
- Release: August 30, 1993 – May 20, 2015

Related
- The David Letterman Show; Late Night with David Letterman; My Next Guest Needs No Introduction with David Letterman

Late Show with David Letterman is an American late-night talk show hosted by David Letterman on CBS, the first iteration of the Late Show franchise. The show debuted on August 30, 1993, and was produced by Letterman's production company, Worldwide Pants, and CBS Television Studios. The show's music director and leader of the house band, the CBS Orchestra, was Paul Shaffer. The head writer was Matt Roberts and the announcer was originally Bill Wendell, then Alan Kalter. In most American markets, the show aired from 11:35 p.m. to 12:37 a.m. Eastern and Pacific Time, and recorded Monday to Wednesdays at 4:30 p.m., and Thursdays at 3:30 p.m. and 6:00 p.m. Eastern Time. The second Thursday episode usually aired on Friday of that week.

In 2002, Late Show with David Letterman was ranked No. 7 on TV Guide's 50 Greatest TV Shows of All Time. As host of both Late Night and Late Show for more than 30 years, Letterman surpassed Johnny Carson as the longest-running late-night talk show host in 2013. That same year, Late Night and Late Show were ranked at No. 41 on TV Guide's 60 Best Series of All Time. The show was nominated for the Primetime Emmy Award for Outstanding Variety Series 16 times, winning 6. It was also nominated for the Primetime Emmy Award for Outstanding Directing for a Variety Series 15 times, and was nominated for the Primetime Emmy Award for Outstanding Writing for a Variety Series 16 times during its run.

Title card used from April 22, 2013, to May 20, 2015, based on the marquee outside of CBS Studio 50 at the time

In 2014, Letterman announced his retirement; the final episode of Late Show aired on May 20, 2015. After Letterman's final Late Show, instead of airing reruns of the show or having guest host episodes of Late Show, CBS opted to air reruns of scripted dramas in the 11:35 p.m. time slot over the summer with the branding CBS Summer Showcase. The show was then succeeded by The Late Show with Stephen Colbert, hosted by Stephen Colbert, which premiered on September 8, 2015 and ended in 2026.

== History ==
CBS had previously attempted late-night talk shows with The Merv Griffin Show (1969–1972) and The Pat Sajak Show (1989–1990), but Griffin clashed with network censors and moved to syndication while Sajak was unable to compete with NBC's The Tonight Show Starring Johnny Carson and was canceled due to poor ratings. For most of the 20 years preceding Late Show, CBS's late-night fare consisted of movies, reruns and specialty programming packaged under the name CBS Late Night and broadcast to middling ratings. When David Letterman became available following a conflict with NBC, CBS was eager to lure him and offered him a three-year, $14 million per year contract, doubling his Late Night salary. According to their agreement, the show would spend a month in Hollywood at least once a year.

CBS purchased the Ed Sullivan Theater for $4 million, spending "several million" to renovate it. The renovation was supervised by architect James Polshek. CBS's total cost for acquiring the show including renovations, negotiation rights paid to NBC, signing Letterman, announcer Bill Wendell, Shaffer, the writers and the band was over $140 million.

A significant issue regarding Letterman's move to CBS was the ownership of long-running comedy bits used on Late Night, as well as the name of the CBS show itself. NBC claimed that much of what he did on Late Night was intellectual property of the network. Letterman and his attorneys countered that some segments ("Stupid Pet Tricks", for example) pre-dated Late Night and had first aired on The David Letterman Show, which was owned by Letterman's production company rather than NBC, and others, such as the Top Ten List and Viewer Mail, were not eligible for intellectual property protection and belonged neither to Letterman nor NBC. Ultimately a compromise was reached in key areas: the "Viewer Mail" segment would be called the "CBS Mailbag"; the actor portraying Larry "Bud" Melman on Late Night would use his real name, Calvert DeForest, on the CBS show; and Paul Shaffer's "World's Most Dangerous Band" would become the "CBS Orchestra".

NBC gave Letterman the choice of at least two options to name his new show, Late Show with David Letterman or Nightly with David Letterman. On this matter CBS executives stepped in, rejecting Nightly in part because of potential confusion with Nightline on ABC, along with the NBC Nightly News. Thus, Late Show with David Letterman quickly became the official name.

After Letterman was introduced on Late Show's very first episode, NBC Nightly News anchor Tom Brokaw accompanied him on stage and wished him "reasonably well". As part of a pre-arranged act, Brokaw then proceeded to retrieve a pair of cue cards while stating that "These last two jokes are the intellectual property of NBC!" After he carried them off stage, Letterman responded, "Who would have thought you would ever hear the words 'intellectual property' and 'NBC' in the same sentence?" In his opening monologue, Letterman said "Legally, I can continue to call myself Dave" but joked that he woke up that morning and next to him in bed was the head of a peacock (while the orchestra played the theme from The Godfather).

In ratings, Letterman's Late Show dominated Jay Leno's Tonight Show for its first two years. Leno pulled ahead on July 10, 1995, starting with a Hugh Grant interview, after Grant's much-publicized arrest for picking up a Los Angeles prostitute. Leno also benefited from the lead-in provided by NBC's popular Must See TV prime time programs of the mid-to-late 1990s. Likewise, the CBS network was hindered by a weak prime time lineup, along with several large- and major-market network affiliation switches in late 1994 relating to Fox's acquisition of CBS's National Football League rights, stunting the Late Show just as it was beginning to gain traction.

Announcer Bill Wendell retired in 1995, with Alan Kalter taking his place.

At times Late Show even came in third in its time slot (behind Nightline, most recently in November 2008), once prompting Letterman to arrange for a Manhattan billboard proudly declaring himself and his show to be No. 3 in Late Night, aping an older, nearby billboard which promoted Leno and The Tonight Show as No. 1. Letterman attempted to respond by making his show more political, aping the approach taken by The Daily Show under Jon Stewart. He acknowledged in 2024 that he believed that the Late Show had lost ground to Tonight because Leno was an everyman whose show was "more likable than the show I was doing," and that Letterman had made "certain elemental mistakes" that handicapped the Late Show's performance.

On June 1, 2009, Conan O'Brien (who had succeeded Letterman as host of Late Night in 1993) took over as host of The Tonight Show—an event Letterman referenced in his own show's Top Ten List on that night—and Letterman's "feud" with Leno temporarily ceased. In 2008 Letterman told Rolling Stone that he would welcome Leno on his show once Leno's tenure ended. Letterman said on competing with O'Brien, "I still find it hard to believe that Jay won't be there." The interview was held prior to Leno announcing his return to NBC for The Jay Leno Show. In the second week after Letterman and O'Brien began their opposing broadcasts, viewer ratings for Tonight began to slip and Late Show was poised to beat Tonight for the first time in over ten years, a fact pointed out by Letterman's guests on air (Howard Stern and Julia Roberts). Letterman quickly tried to change the subject in the interviews and tried to avert a new rivalry. In fact, the June 9, 2009 episode of Late Show featuring Roberts rated better than Tonight with a 3.4 household rating nationally to O'Brien's 2.9. The Letterman/Leno feud was revived in the wake of the 2010 Tonight Show conflict, which saw Letterman side with O'Brien. Despite the rivalry, Leno appeared in a Late Show promo with Letterman and Oprah Winfrey which aired on CBS during Super Bowl XLIV; it was Leno and Letterman's first joint appearance since Leno took over the Tonight Show in 1992. The feud between the hosts ended for good on February 6, 2014, with Leno's second and final retirement and Late Night host Jimmy Fallon, who succeeded Conan O'Brien in 2009, becoming the current host of the Tonight Show on February 17, with its subsequent return to New York for the first time since 1972.

On April 3, 2012, CBS reached an agreement with Worldwide Pants and CBS Television Studios to continue the show through 2014. The parties reached another agreement in October 2013 to extend the show an additional year, continuing the series into 2015. Including his 11 years on NBC, Letterman is the longest tenured late-night talk show host in America, having surpassed Johnny Carson.

On April 10, 2014, one week after Letterman announced that he would retire as host of Late Show in 2015, CBS announced that his successor as the host of the program would be Stephen Colbert, then host of competing late-night series The Colbert Report on Comedy Central. Letterman's last Late Show aired May 20, 2015. In February 2022, David Letterman's official YouTube channel opened, and contains clips from Letterman's Late Show and his previous morning and late night shows on NBC.

== Staff ==
Announcer Bill Wendell retired and left the show on August 18, 1995. He was replaced by Alan Kalter on the show's next episode, September 5, 1995, which came after a two-week hiatus. Kalter became the longest tenured announcer for the remainder of the show.

In 1996, long-time producer Robert Morton left, and head writer Rob Burnett was promoted to executive producer.

In 1997, Justin Stangel and Eric Stangel were hired as writers; by March 2000, the Stangel brothers became the show's head writers, taking over the job held by Rodney Rothman.

Director Hal Gurnee and producer Peter Lassally left the show soon after to pursue other interests. Gurnee was replaced by Jerry Foley. Burnett was absent from the day-to-day operations from 2000 to 2004, and was replaced by Barbara Gaines and Maria Pope, both of whom served as executive producers, with Gaines acting as on-air producer. In 2003, producer Jude Brennan was added to the team of executive producers.

Lassally, who had served as an executive producer for Johnny Carson on The Tonight Show, was invited back to Late Show in January 2005 as a guest to discuss the recent death of Carson. Lassally served as executive producer for Worldwide Pants' The Late Late Show from late 1994 to February 2015, encompassing the tenures of hosts Tom Snyder, Craig Kilborn and Craig Ferguson. Lassally also served as Executive Producer of the Tony Mendez Show, an online webcast featuring Late Show's "cue card boy", Tony Mendez (c.1945–July 29, 2021). Mendez served in that capacity until 2014, when after a long-running dispute with writer Bill Scheft over Scheft micromanaging Mendez's job, he attacked Scheft and was fired.

Matt Roberts, a long-time writer and producer for the show, became the show's head writer in January 2013, replacing brothers and co-head writers Justin Stangel and Eric Stangel.

Sheila Rogers, the producer responsible for booking guests on the show, worked for Letterman since his Late Night days.

Biff Henderson served as the show's stage manager, carrying over from Late Night. Henderson had a prominent on-camera role with the show.

== Production ==
=== Studio and set design ===
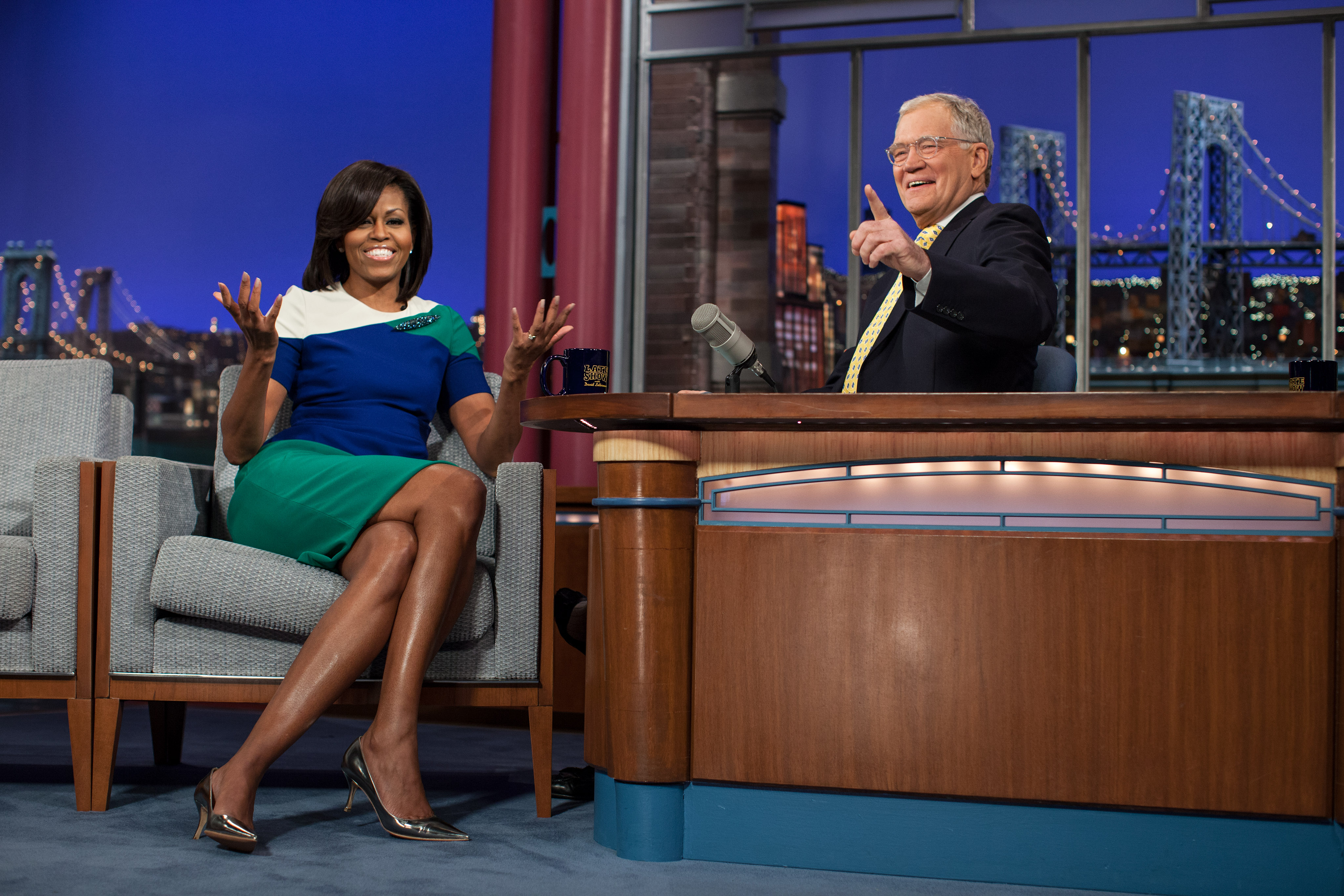
Letterman interviewing Michelle Obama in 2012

The show was taped at the Ed Sullivan Theater at the corner of Broadway and 53rd Street in midtown Manhattan during its entire run. Formerly called CBS Studio 50, it had been home to several TV programs over the years, most notably The Ed Sullivan Show. Letterman made use of the immediate neighborhood surrounding the theater for his show on occasion, closing off the portion of 53rd Street that goes past his studio for various stunts. Nearby merchants gained fame after making frequent appearances on the program, including Rupert Jee, owner of the Hello Deli at 213 W. 53rd St., and Mujibur and Sirajul, Bengali immigrants who worked at a souvenir shop close to the studio.

The stage layout followed the same basic structure Letterman employed on Late Night: the house band appeared on the far left, followed by the performance area and then the interview set.

In May 2015, days before Letterman retired, Seth Stevenson described what it was like to attend a taping of Late Show:

It felt almost regal to enter the Ed Sullivan Theater beneath a lit marquee on 53rd and Broadway instead of through some unmarked, dented metal door on an industrial block of Hell's Kitchen. The theater for Late Show with David Letterman seats 450 people instead of 100, and its rococo balcony offers a glorious vista over the sprawling stage where the Beatles first performed in America. Instead of bathing us in washed-out, piped-in music, or a half-hearted pop quintet, Paul Shaffer and the CBS Orchestra rocked us with a wall of sound, including a horn section that blasted riffs clear to the theater rafters ... It was hard not to sit in that Late Show studio audience and feel—for the first time—indispensable. Letterman puts on a show. He presents fully rounded entertainment, and he feeds off the energy in the room. This is a big, brassy venue with a live orchestra, instead of a cramped black-box studio with somebody's iPod plugged into ceiling speakers. And Letterman needed us there.

Pieces of the set were later acquired for use on The Chris Gethard Show.

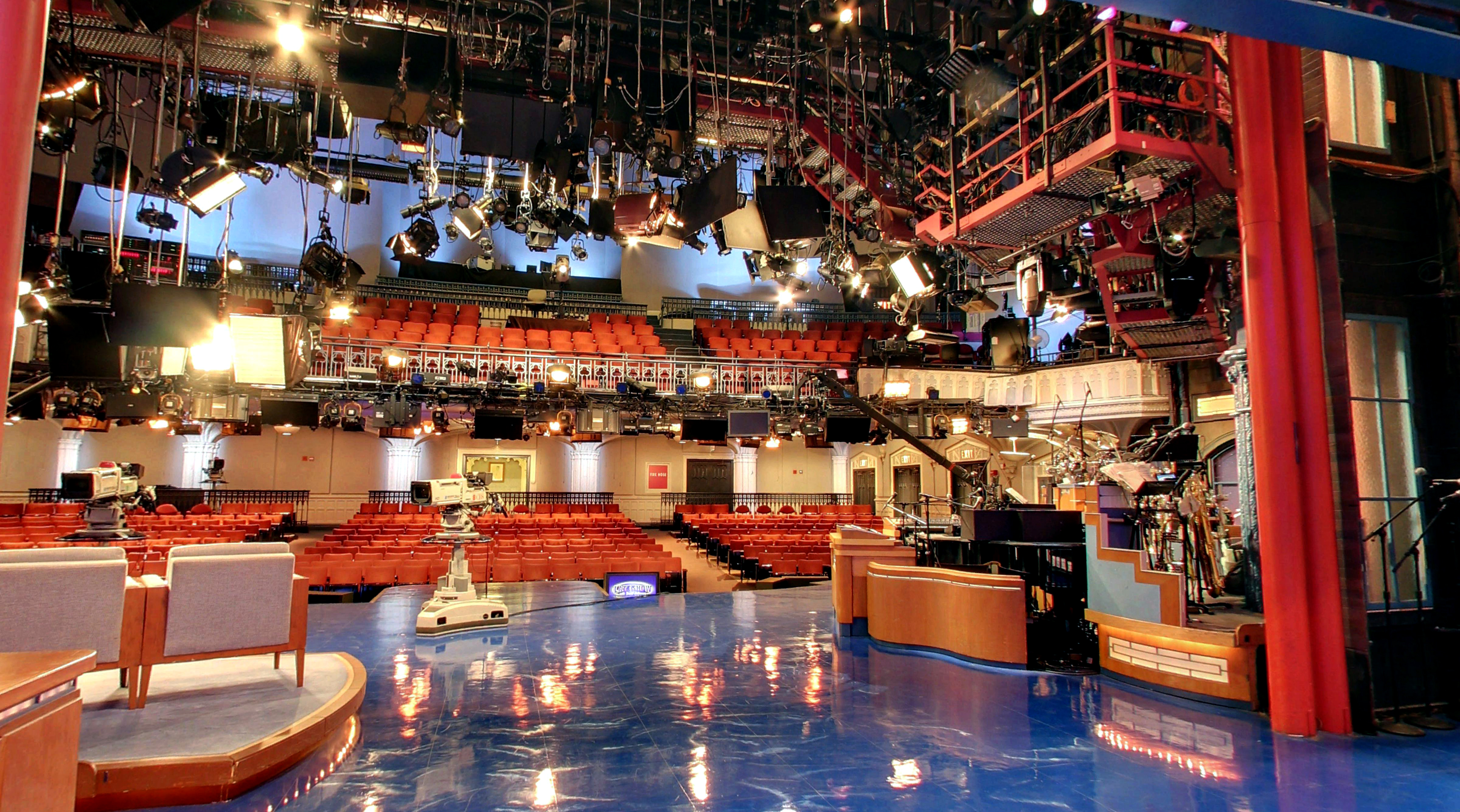
View from the proscenium of the Ed Sullivan theater

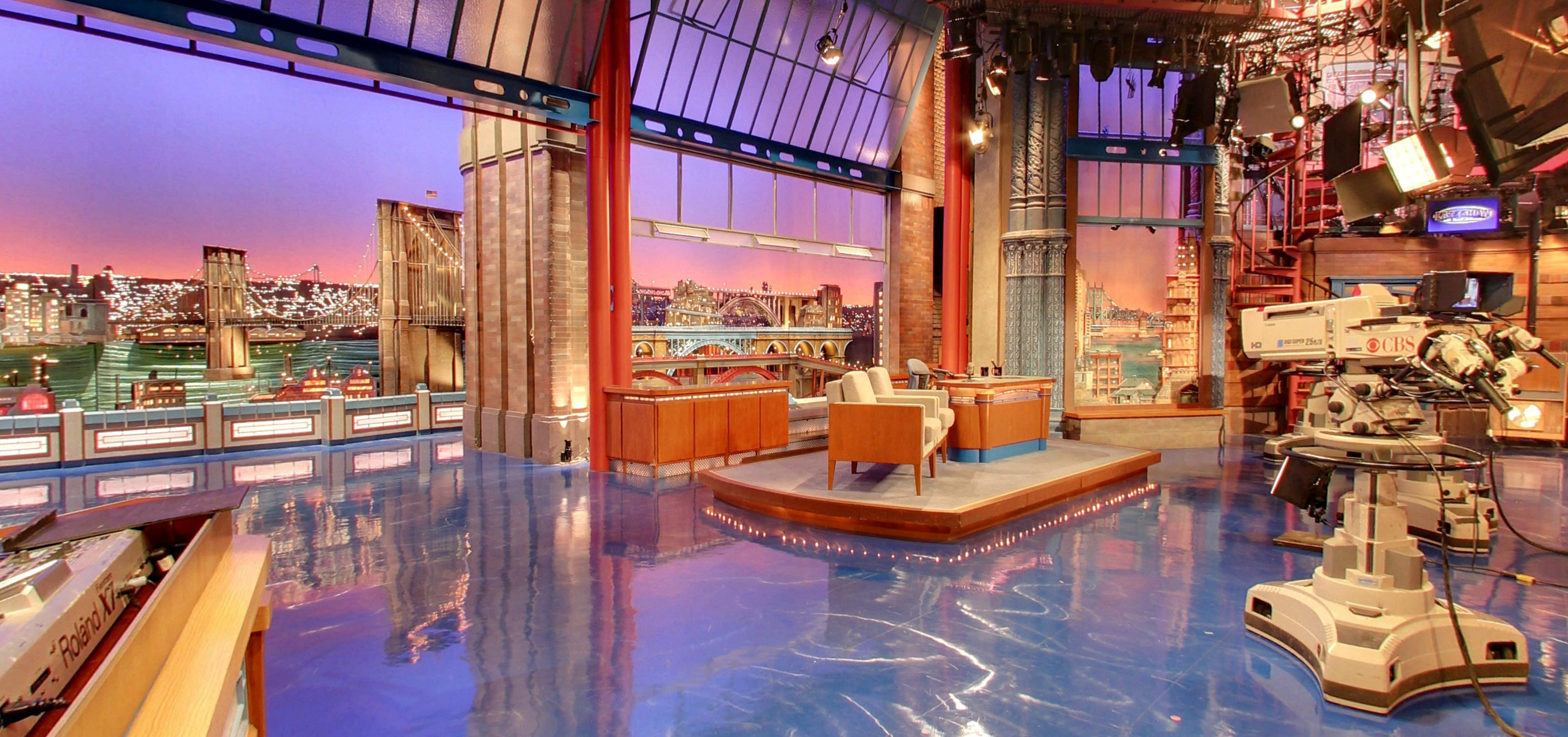
View of the stage with David Letterman's desk and guest seats

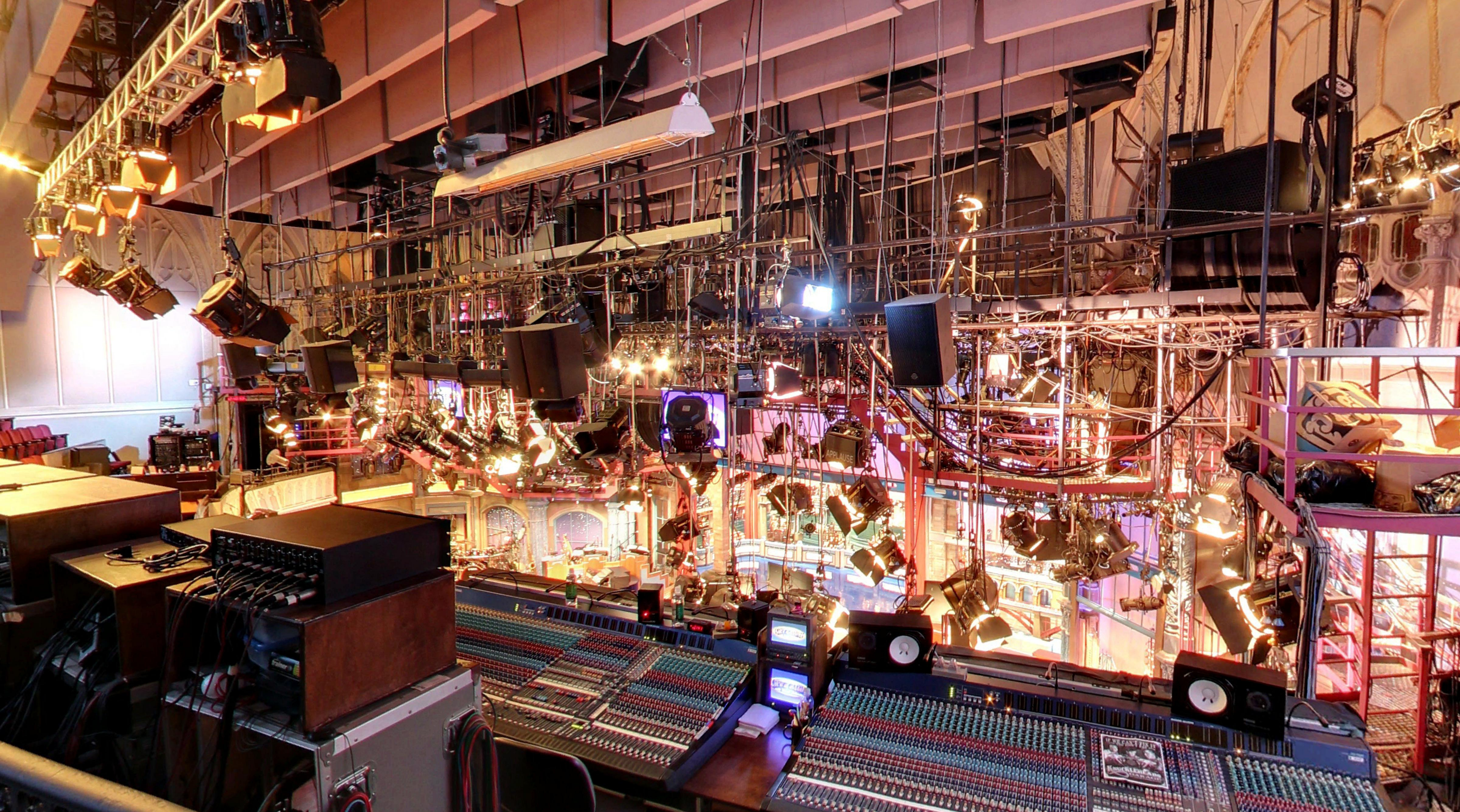
View from the balcony

=== Same-day tapings ===
When Letterman was not on vacation (which he took roughly ten weeks per year), he and his crew worked four days per week, taping Friday's show earlier in the week. From October 2001 until May 2004, Friday's show was taped on Thursdays. From 2004 to 2010, Friday's show was taped on Mondays. During this time, the Friday's show's monologue topics, sketches, and other segments were chosen for their lack of topicality, with few if any references to current events or any subject which would run the risk of seeming dated. However, in late 2011 Late Show reverted to the practice of taping the Friday show on Thursdays, helping the Friday shows become more topical and relevant.

=== Episode structure ===
The show's opening credits featured a series of shots of New York City as the CBS Orchestra performed the Late Show theme (a livelier variation of the more jazzy Late Night theme). The announcer presented the names of that night's guests, as well as Paul Shaffer and the CBS Orchestra, then introduced Letterman. On rare episodes, the show began with a cold open as Letterman, dressed casually, briefly interacted with a celebrity or performed a short sketch backstage before the traditional opening sequence began. As with his previous shows, the copy for the open included non sequiturs about New York and Letterman, though the former would change after the September 11 attacks to simply "the greatest city in the world".

In the last few years, Alan Kalter included himself in the introduction. In addition, Letterman took to dashing across the stage either just before, while, or just after Kalter introduced him. In years prior, Letterman would be greeted by two female models, sometimes in costume. For an extended stretch of episodes, one of the models would be performing with several hula hoops, while the other would be wearing a metal suit and operating a grinding machine against her abdomen, a carry-over from their first appearance on the sketch, "Is This Anything?"

Letterman would then walk out on the show stage to perform his stand-up monologue, which occasionally began with a reference to something an audience member said to him during the pre-show question-and-answer session. The jokes were based on pop culture, current events, and politics. He then introduced one or two video jokes such as a running gag or fake commercial/public service announcement. The monologue was followed by Letterman's introduction of Shaffer and the CBS Orchestra. Beginning in 2009, a commercial break replaced Letterman's trademark 'crossing to the desk', which he had done since the early years. Letterman then chatted with the audience and Shaffer, sometimes relating an anecdote from his personal life, sometimes discussing his anticipation of a particular guest; a running gag may have been featured.

In 2005, after the death of Johnny Carson, it was revealed that Carson had made a habit of sometimes sending jokes to Letterman which Letterman would then incorporate into his monologues. The January 31, 2005, episode of the Late Show, which featured a tribute to Carson, began with a monologue made up entirely of jokes written by Carson since his retirement.

Letterman read the Top Ten List at this point before turning to guest interviews with a celebrity, politician, or other public figure. On most episodes, the first guest stayed on through the commercial break and continued the interview.

Following the first guest was a short segment to bridge two commercial breaks sequentially. In earlier episodes, Letterman would return to his running gag during this break, or retry a failed stunt from earlier in the show. Later episodes included a brief comedy announcement from announcer Alan Kalter while showing the audience cheering.

The final segment consisted of a live musical performance, a comedian performing a stand-up routine, or another guest interview. Musical guests included artists from David Bowie, U2, Neil Young, Coldplay to indie bands like Grizzly Bear, Gorillaz, MENEW, and Animal Collective. The CBS Orchestra frequently accompanied musical guests in performing their songs. Episodes occasionally concluded with Letterman recommending viewers stay tuned for Tom Snyder, Craig Kilborn, Craig Ferguson (James Corden in 2015), but usually he simply waved to the camera, saying, "Good night everybody!" In the latter part of the run, the admonishment to watch Craig Ferguson and James Corden was delivered by Alan Kalter, via voiceover.

=== Regular sketches ===
Late Show had various repeated absurdist segments, including those involving cast members' and audience participation. The show also took a camera crew into the Hello Deli to show games such as "What's on the iPod?" and "Beat the Clock", or onto 53rd Street or the roof to record various stunts there.

=== High-definition broadcasts ===
The show began broadcasting in high-definition television (HDTV) on August 29, 2005. About two weeks later, Tim Kennedy, the show's Technical Director, commented on the transition in the show's official newsletter:

The biggest challenge in the HD conversion was to renovate and upgrade our old control room, audio room, videotape room, and edit room while still doing five shows a week. ... This entailed putting a remote production truck on 53rd Street running somewhere in the neighborhood of 50,000 feet of video and audio cable just to tie the truck to the existing technical plant ... The coolest piece of equipment is our new control room Virtual Wall. We have done away with the conventional monitor for every video source and replaced it with four 70-inch rear projection screens and within those screens we can "virtually" place as many video images as we want, anywhere we want them, and when we want it.

Kennedy and his crew won an Emmy Award for "Outstanding Technical Direction, Camerawork, Video for a Series" during the nearly four-month-long transition to HDTV.

== Notable episodes ==
The guests with the most appearances were Regis Philbin (150 appearances), Marv Albert (126 appearances, 73 from Late Night), and Jack Hanna (102).

Among the show's highlights:

- The premiere on August 30, 1993, which attracted 23 million viewers; Bill Murray was the show's first guest, and Billy Joel was the show's first musical act;
- In a September 7, 1993, interview, Rosie Perez mentioned that she had attended a DJ party called Funkmaster Flex Night to which Letterman jokingly displayed his ignorance by pretending to know with the response "Funk. Master. Flex night… Hard to get a ticket to Funkmaster Flex Night." This was later sampled by the DJ himself and it became a famous needle drop in the hip-hop community. Letterman was made aware of this cultural moment 26 years later by Desus and Mero when he appeared on their show.
- The episode featuring Madonna on March 31, 1994;
- A visit from Drew Barrymore on April 12, 1995, during which she "jump[ed] on his desk and flash[ed] her breasts" in a "birthday gift he'll never forget";
- The episode on December 31, 1999, airing in prime-time.
- The episodes airing the week of February 21, 2000, which began with Letterman's return to the air after his quintuple bypass surgery, with Bill Cosby hosting the show of February 22, as the show's first ever substitute host, and Regis Philbin hosting on February 24.
- His return to the airwaves on September 17, 2001, following the September 11 attacks in a show that featured Dan Rather, Regis Philbin, the Boys' Choir of Harlem, and Odetta—it was "hailed by the New York Daily News as 'one of the purest, most honest and important moments in TV history'."
- The October 30, 2002, episode in which the sole guest was frequent guest and substitute bandleader Warren Zevon, devoted to discussing Zevon's terminal cancer diagnosis.
- March 17, 2004, Courtney Love appeared on the show to promote her debut solo album, America's Sweetheart. Her appearance drew widespread media coverage when she lifted her shirt multiple times and flashed her breasts at Letterman in a reenactment of Drew Barrymore's appearance.
- January 31, 2005, was Letterman's first show after his long-time friend and mentor Johnny Carson had died. His monologue that night consisted entirely of jokes written by Carson. Carson had died on January 23, but Letterman's show was in reruns at the time.
- January 2, 2008, was the first night the Late Show returned to air after the 2007 WGA strike began. Due to a compromise worked out between Worldwide Pants and WGA, Late Show was allowed to continue with writers on the job until the strike ended in February 2008.
- On September 24, 2008, John McCain was originally scheduled to be the guest on the show but cancelled at the last minute, supposedly to deal with the economic crisis. However, it was revealed during the show that while the show was being taped, McCain was actually doing an interview with Katie Couric for CBS News. McCain's last-minute replacement was Keith Olbermann.
- Paul McCartney appeared as a guest on July 15, 2009, in the same theater where the Beatles made their U.S. television debut in 1964. McCartney later performed "Get Back" on top of the theater's marquee, emulating the Beatles' rooftop concert of 1969.
- On October 1, 2009, Letterman revealed that he had been the target of an extortion attempt.
- On October 29, 2012, the show was taped without an audience due to Hurricane Sandy, which prompted the Late Show staff to send the audience home for safety reasons.
- On April 3, 2014, Letterman announced his retirement from the Late Show.
- On April 22, 2014, Stephen Colbert made his first appearance on the Late Show since being unveiled as Letterman's successor.
- On August 18, 2014, in his first new show since the death of Robin Williams, Letterman paid tribute to the comedian, whom he had known dating back to their days at the Comedy Store in Los Angeles. "I had no idea that the man was in pain, that the man was suffering," Letterman said of Williams, who committed suicide. A montage of clips aired featuring Williams' multiple appearances on the Late Show, as well as an episode of Mork & Mindy in which Letterman was a guest star. The tribute was the week's most watched late night talk show video, receiving over 3.3 million views online.
- On December 18, 2014, singer Darlene Love performed "Christmas (Baby Please Come Home)" for the final time on the show after performing it every year since the show began.
- The series finale on May 20, 2015, which ran 17 minutes over time and had 13.7 million viewers, was introduced by archival footage of President Gerald Ford and pre-recorded cameos of former Presidents George H. W. Bush, Bill Clinton, George W. Bush, and incumbent Barack Obama all saying, "our long national nightmare is over". Ten celebrities participated in the Top Ten List of "Things I've Always Wanted to say to Dave", namely, in order of appearance, Alec Baldwin, Barbara Walters, Steve Martin, Jerry Seinfeld, Jim Carrey, Chris Rock, Julia Louis-Dreyfus, Peyton Manning, Tina Fey, and Bill Murray. Letterman thanked his wife Regina and son Harry, both of whom were in the audience, his mother, viewers, the show's staff, and Paul Shaffer and the band, and also wished good luck to his successor, Stephen Colbert. The show included highlights from The David Letterman Show and Late Night with David Letterman as well as the Late Show, featured clips of Letterman's bits with children, a performance by the Foo Fighters playing Letterman's favorite song, "Everlong", and ended with a shot of his son, Harry, skiing.

=== Most Late Show appearances ===
The person who appeared the most on the Late Show was media personality Regis Philbin, with 150 total appearances over the show's 22-season run. Jack Hanna was in second place with 103 appearances, followed by Tony Randall with 70, Marv Albert with 52, and Tom Brokaw with 49.

Darlene Love appeared with a musical number 21 times, most notably for a 19-year-long annual tradition of her performing "Christmas (Baby Please Come Home)" (18 live plus one video clip) on the show's last episode before Christmas. This continued a tradition that started in 1986 on Letterman's NBC show Late Night with David Letterman, performing the song as Letterman's Christmas finale 28 times across his Late Show and Late Night run. Love's final Christmas appearance was on December 19, 2014, nine days after the announcement that the show's finale would be in May 2015. Letterman has stated that the annual performance is his favorite part of Christmas. Due to the 2007 Writers Guild of America strike, Love was unable to perform on the Letterman show in 2007; instead, a repeat of her 2006 performance was shown. Love was also the musical guest on May 7, 2007, performing "River Deep – Mountain High", while also appearing as a background choral singer on October 15, 2008. Love had a 22nd appearance, appearing as an interview guest on June 12, 2013, to talk about the documentary 20 Feet from Stardom.

Blues Traveler holds the record for most appearances on the show by a band.

== Guest hosts ==
In 2000, after Letterman had quintuple bypass surgery, the Late Show Backstage was aired. This featured many celebrities reminiscing about their experiences as guests on his show. Charles Grodin (February 7), Regis Philbin (February 8 and 10), Bandleader Paul Shaffer (February 9 and 11), Drew Barrymore (February 14), David Brenner (February 15), Tom Snyder (February 16 and 17) (Snyder hosted The Late Late Show from 1995 to 1999), and Tom Arnold (February 18) were among those who hosted. These interviews were interspersed with past footage. Previously, only reruns without any special introductions had been aired since Letterman's temporary leave from the show began on January 15.

Letterman returned on a limited basis on February 18, in a show which premiered three days later. To ease his transition back to air, temporary guest hosts carried the show. Bill Cosby (February 22), Kathie Lee Gifford (February 24), David Brenner (February 29), Nathan Lane (March 2), Janeane Garofalo (March 7), filled in on the first week.

In February and March 2003, Letterman missed 14 shows due to shingles. Letterman had various guest hosts during his illness-inflicted absence: Bruce Willis (February 26), John McEnroe (February 27), Regis Philbin (February 28), Whoopi Goldberg (March 10), Vince Vaughn (March 11), Elvis Costello (March 12), Will Ferrell (March 13), Megan Mullally (March 14), Brad Garrett (March 17), Tom Dreesen (March 18), Bonnie Hunt (March 19), Paul Shaffer (March 24), Bill Cosby (March 25), and Luke Wilson (March 26).

In June 2003, Letterman had guest hosts on Fridays. They included Tom Arnold (June 6), Tom Green (June 13), Kelsey Grammer (June 20), and Jimmy Fallon (June 27). Letterman's weekly absence caused the ratings deficit between his show and Leno's to increase, so Letterman ended this experiment a month after it began.

Paul Shaffer hosted January 19, 2005, when Letterman went to receive an award for his racing team's victory in the 2004 Indianapolis 500.

On March 20, 2007, Letterman fell ill less than an hour before the show started, and scheduled guest Adam Sandler took his place as host. Actor Don Cheadle, Sandler's co-star in the film Reign Over Me, appeared as a guest on a moment's notice.

== Awards ==
=== Primetime Emmy ===
Late Show with David Letterman was nominated as Outstanding Variety, Music or Comedy Series for 16 seasons in a row, from the 1993–94 season through the 2008–09 season. Including the nominations for its NBC Late Night predecessor, the Letterman cast and crew had been nominated 26 consecutive times in this category.

Late Show with David Letterman won the award six times:

- 1993–94 winner Outstanding Variety, Music or Comedy Series
- 1997–98 winner Outstanding Variety, Music or Comedy Series
- 1998–99 winner Outstanding Variety, Music or Comedy Series
- 1999–00 winner Outstanding Variety, Music or Comedy Series
- 2000–01 winner Outstanding Variety, Music or Comedy Series
- 2001–02 winner Outstanding Variety, Music or Comedy Series

== Ratings and revenue ==
The show's highest-rated episode was on February 23, 1994, after the 1994 Winter Olympics (78.8 million) with 15 million viewers. Its second-highest-rated show aired two days later with 11.1 million viewers. Both were preceded by the ladies' figure skating competition which had high interest due to the assault of Nancy Kerrigan at the 1994 United States Figure Skating Championships by Tonya Harding's ex-husband and due to both women competing in the event.

In February 2013, TV by the Numbers reported that Late Show averaged about 3.1 million per show in season-to-date live-plus-seven-day ratings (i.e., from February 4). A year later, average viewership was down to 2.8 million.

In 2009, the show led other late-night shows in ad revenue with $271 million. In February 2014, Advertising Age cited Kantar Media and Nielsen in reporting that for January to October 2013, Late Show attracted $179.6 million in advertising for CBS, higher than its seven late-night competitors on NBC, ABC, Comedy Central, and E!. Late Show also had the oldest median audience among those same peer broadcasts, at 58.9.

The final episode of Late Show with David Letterman on May 20, 2015, was watched by 13.76 million viewers with an audience share of 9.3/24, earning the show its second-highest ratings (following the 1994 Olympics on February 25, 1994); further, it saw the show's highest demo numbers (4.1 in adults 25-54 and 3.1 in adults 18–49) since Oprah Winfrey's first Late Show appearance following the ending of her feud with Letterman on December 1, 2005. In a rarity for a late-night show, it was also the highest-rated program across all network television that night, beating out all primetime shows. In Canada, the final episode was watched by 784,000 viewers, representing 516,000 more viewers than the show's closest competitor.

Late Show with David Letterman has a 100% Average Tomatometer and 78% Popcorn meter on Rotten Tomatoes.

== International broadcast ==
In the UK, the show was aired on Sky One, The Paramount Comedy Channel, ITV2, ITV4 and Diva TV. It was also shown for a week on BBC2 during Letterman's London shows in 1995. In Australia, the show aired on Network 10 only hours after American broadcast.

In Italy, the show aired on RaiSat Show (later RaiSat Extra and Rai 5), in English with Italian subtitles. In France, the show aired on Comédie+ the day after the American broadcast, in English with French subtitles.

In Hungary and Romania, the show aired on AXN between 2008 and 2009, around two weeks after the American broadcast, in English with subtitles.

== See also ==
- List of late-night network TV programs
- Stupid Pet Tricks (TV series)

== Notes ==
Media offices
Preceded by First	Late Show era by host August 30, 1993 – May 20, 2015	Succeeded by The Late Show with Stephen Colbert
