= The Late Late Show with Craig Kilborn =

American late-night talk show (1999–2004)

- Genre: Late-night talk show
- Presented by: Craig Kilborn
- Country of origin: United States
- Original language: English
- No. of seasons: 5
- No. of episodes: 1,190

Production
- Executive producer: Peter Lassally
- Production locations: CBS Television City, Los Angeles, California
- Camera setup: Multi-camera
- Running time: 45 minutes
- Production company: Worldwide Pants

Original release
- Network: CBS
- Release: March 30, 1999 – August 27, 2004

Related
- Late Show with David Letterman; The Daily Show

The Late Late Show with Craig Kilborn is an American late-night talk show hosted by Craig Kilborn that aired on CBS from March 30, 1999, to August 27, 2004. It is the second incarnation of CBS's The Late Late Show franchise and followed Late Show with David Letterman in the network's late-night lineup.

The series replaced The Late Late Show with Tom Snyder and adopted a more comedy-oriented format emphasizing celebrity interviews, recurring comedy segments, and Kilborn's sarcastic, self-aware on-air persona.

== History ==
In 1998, CBS announced that Kilborn would succeed Tom Snyder as host of The Late Late Show. Kilborn had previously gained prominence as an anchor on ESPN's SportsCenter and as the original host of The Daily Show on Comedy Central.

Kilborn debuted as host on March 30, 1999. Unlike Snyder's interview-focused program, Kilborn's version emphasized comedy, irony, and a deliberately detached hosting style.

The program was produced by David Letterman's production company, Worldwide Pants, with veteran late-night producer Peter Lassally serving as executive producer.

== Format ==
The series followed the traditional late-night talk show format, featuring an opening monologue, comedy desk pieces, celebrity interviews, and musical guests. Recurring segments included "5 Questions", "Yambo", "What Up?", and "To Hell with..."

Kilborn cultivated a comedic persona characterized by mock arrogance, ironic detachment, and frequent references to old Hollywood glamour and his own supposed sophistication.

== Reception ==
During its run, The Late Late Show with Craig Kilborn competed primarily against NBC's Late Night with Conan O'Brien and, later, ABC's Jimmy Kimmel Live!.

Critical reception to Kilborn's hosting style was mixed, although the program developed a loyal following among younger viewers. Reviewers frequently noted the contrast between Kilborn's ironic style and the more earnest approach of many competing late-night hosts.

== Departure ==
In August 2004, Kilborn announced that he would leave the program when his contract expired. CBS subsequently employed a rotating group of guest hosts while searching for a replacement.

Kilborn later stated that he had grown dissatisfied with the repetitive nature of late-night television and viewed his departure as a form of early retirement.

In December 2004, CBS announced that Scottish comedian and actor Craig Ferguson would become the next permanent host of the program.

== See also ==
- The Late Late Show
- Late Show with David Letterman
- Late Night with Conan O'Brien
- Jimmy Kimmel Live!
