= Peter Lassally =

German-born American television producer (1932–2026)

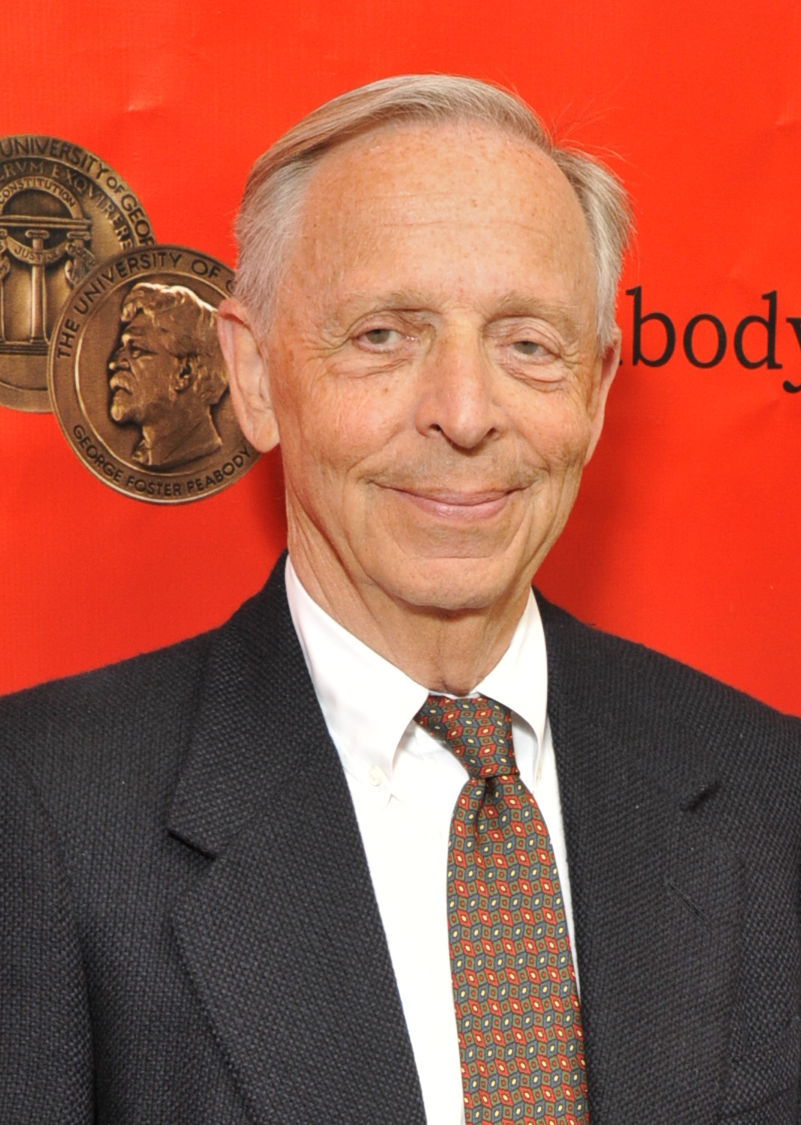
- Lassally at the 69th Annual Peabody Awards in May 2010
- Born: October 14, 1932; Hamburg, Germany
- Died: July 19, 2026 (aged 93); Los Angeles, California, U.S.
- Education: Newtown High School
- Occupation: Television executive producer
- Years active: 1951–2015
- Employer(s): NBC (1970–1980), Carson Productions (1980–1992), Worldwide Pants (1992–2015)
- Notable work: The Tonight Show Starring Johnny Carson, Late Show with David Letterman, The Late Late Show with Craig Ferguson

Peter Lassally (October 14, 1932 – July 19, 2026) was a German-born American executive who served as the executive producer of The Tonight Show Starring Johnny Carson, Late Night with David Letterman, the Late Show with David Letterman, and The Late Late Show with Craig Ferguson.

== Early life ==
Lassally was born into a Jewish family in Hamburg, Germany, on October 14, 1932. They fled to the Netherlands in 1938 before the outbreak of World War II, where he went to grade-school with Anne Frank, who was in his sister's class. In 1943, Lassally and his mother and sister were interned at the Westerbork Nazi concentration camp and then Theresienstadt in Czechoslovakia. In 1947, the family immigrated to New York City. Lassally graduated from Newtown High School. In 1951, he became a page at the NBC network studio.

== Career in television ==
Lassally worked on radio shows including Monitor, Nightline, and The Nation's Future. In the 1950s, he became producer for Arthur Godfrey's television show. Around 1970, Lassally took over as an executive producer of The Tonight Show Starring Johnny Carson. After Carson retired in 1992, Lassally became the executive producer of Late Night with David Letterman and then The Late Show with David Letterman. He was also executive producer of The Late Late Show with Tom Snyder from 1995 to 1999 and mentored Jon Stewart when he was a guest presenter filling in for Snyder. He went into semi-retirement until 2004 when Lassally was asked by the CBS network and Worldwide Pants, Letterman's production company, to oversee the selection of a new Late Late Show host after Craig Kilborn abruptly left. Auditions were held on the air over several months and Lassally recommended Craig Ferguson, persuading CBS and Letterman of the comedian's potential. Lassally then came out of retirement to be executive producer of The Late Late Show with Craig Ferguson. He remained executive producer after Ferguson left to oversee the show through its successive guest hosts prior to the premiere of The Late Late Show with James Corden in March 2015.

As a longtime producer and confidant of successful talk show personalities, Lassally has been referred to as "the host whisperer". He retired on February 20, 2015, after Will Arnett's only show as guest host of the Late Late Show. Lassally appeared with Arnett in a cameo in the show's cold open telling Arnett that all someone needed to be a late night show host was a suit.

== Death ==
Peter Lassally died at a memory care facility in Los Angeles on July 19, 2026, at the age of 93.
