= The Late Late Show with Tom Snyder =

American late-night talk show (1995–1999)

- Genre: Late-night talk show
- Presented by: Tom Snyder
- Theme music composer: David Sanborn
- Country of origin: United States
- Original language: English
- No. of seasons: 5
- No. of episodes: 777

Production
- Executive producer: Peter Lassally
- Producer: Worldwide Pants
- Production locations: CBS Television City, Los Angeles, California
- Camera setup: Multi-camera
- Running time: 45 minutes
- Production company: Worldwide Pants

Original release
- Network: CBS
- Release: January 9, 1995 – March 26, 1999

Related
- The Late Late Show with Craig Kilborn; Late Show with David Letterman; Tomorrow

The Late Late Show with Tom Snyder is an American late-night talk show hosted by broadcaster Tom Snyder that aired on CBS from January 9, 1995, to March 26, 1999. Produced by David Letterman's company Worldwide Pants, the program followed Late Show with David Letterman in CBS's late-night schedule.

The series was noted for its intimate, interview-focused format, lack of a studio audience, and conversational style, which closely resembled Snyder's earlier NBC late-night program Tomorrow.

== History ==
Following David Letterman's move from NBC to CBS in 1993, his production company was granted control over the network's post-Late Show time slot. Letterman strongly advocated for Snyder, whom he had long admired and whose NBC program Tomorrow had previously occupied the time slot after The Tonight Show Starring Johnny Carson before being replaced by Letterman's own Late Night with David Letterman.

CBS executives reportedly preferred a younger comedian and a more traditional comedy-oriented format, but Letterman insisted on Snyder.

The program premiered on January 9, 1995.

== Format ==
Unlike most late-night talk shows of the era, The Late Late Show with Tom Snyder did not feature a studio audience, house band, comedy sketches, or a formal monologue.

The program emphasized lengthy interviews and free-flowing conversations with guests from politics, journalism, entertainment, and popular culture. The absence of a studio audience created a more intimate atmosphere.

The show was broadcast live in the Eastern and Central time zones and was simultaneously carried on several CBS Radio affiliates, allowing listeners to call into the program directly.

Frequent substitute hosts included Jon Stewart, Janeane Garofalo, and Martin Mull.

Jazz musician David Sanborn composed and performed the program's theme music.

== Notable interviews ==
The program featured interviews with actors, musicians, politicians, and controversial public figures. Snyder became known for extended one-on-one conversations conducted in a relaxed and highly conversational style.

Among the show's notable interviews were discussions with Gloria Vanderbilt, actor Robert Blake, and comedian Dennis Miller, who appeared on Snyder's final episode.

== Departure ==
In 1998, reports emerged that CBS and Worldwide Pants were seeking a younger host capable of attracting a broader demographic audience.

Snyder departed the program in March 1999 and was succeeded by Craig Kilborn, whose The Late Late Show with Craig Kilborn adopted a more conventional comedy-oriented late-night format featuring a studio audience and comedy segments.

== Legacy ==
Snyder's version of The Late Late Show has been retrospectively praised for preserving a more intimate and journalism-oriented style of late-night television during an era increasingly dominated by comedy and celebrity promotion.

Later host Craig Ferguson cited Snyder as an influence on his own interview style.

== See also ==
- The Late Late Show
- The Tomorrow Show
- Late Show with David Letterman
- Late Night with David Letterman
