= Craig Kilborn =

American comedian, actor and television host (born 1962)

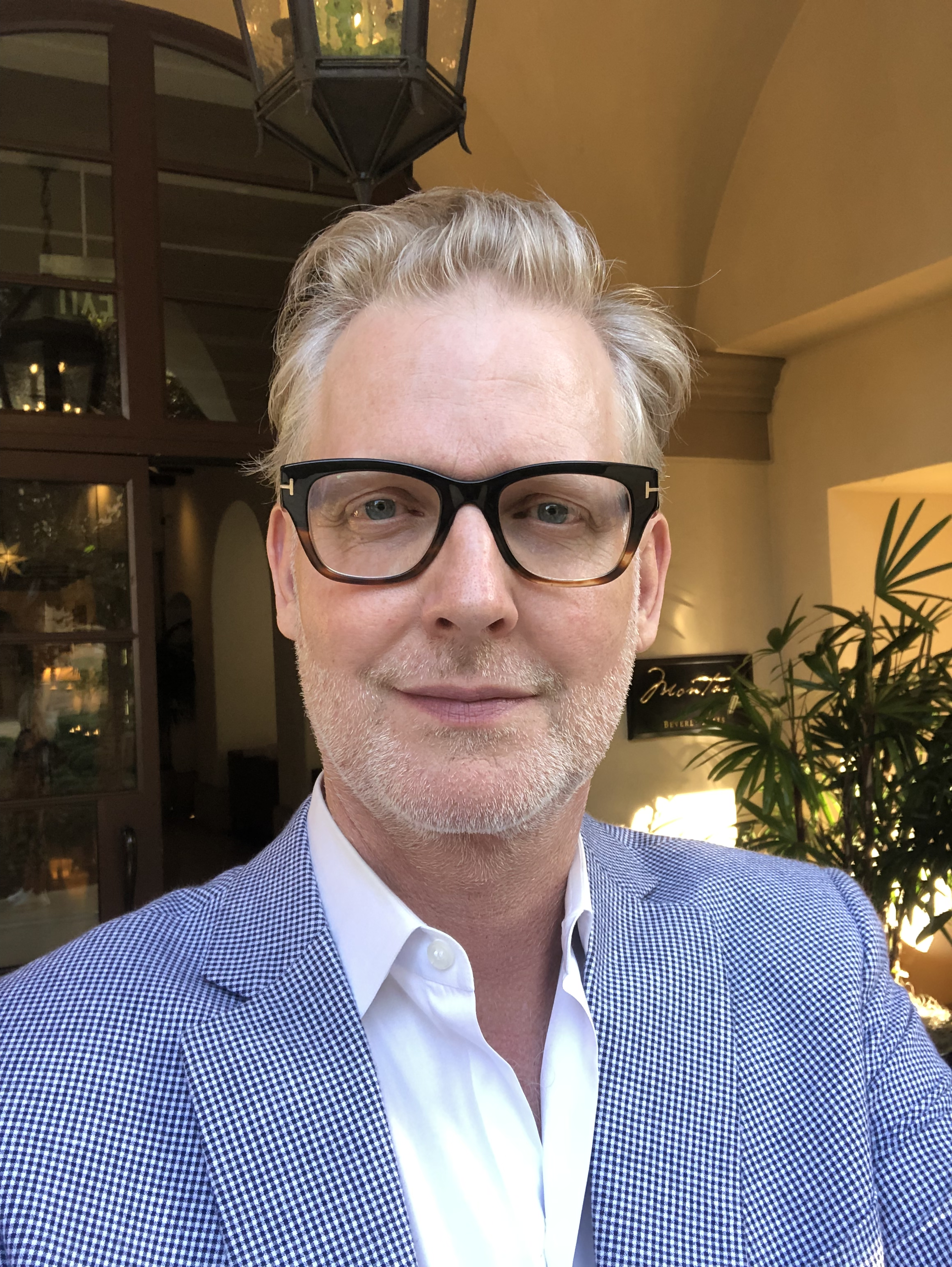
- Kilborn in 2019
- Born: Craig Lawrence Kilborn; August 24, 1962 (age 64); Kansas City, Missouri, U.S.
- Education: Montana State University
- Notable work: SportsCenter (1993–1996); The Daily Show (1996–1998); The Late Late Show (1999–2004)

Comedy career
- Years active: 1986–present
- Medium: Television, film, books
- Genres: Political/news satire, observational comedy, cringe comedy, blue comedy, insult comedy, deadpan
- Subjects: Mass media/news media/media criticism, American politics, American culture, current events, pop culture

Craig Lawrence Kilborn (born August 24, 1962) is an American television host, actor, comedian, director, and sports commentator. Kilborn began a career in sports broadcasting in the late 1980s, leading to an anchoring position at ESPN's SportsCenter from 1993 to 1996. He was later the first host of The Daily Show, which he hosted from 1996 to 1998, and succeeded Tom Snyder on CBS' The Late Late Show with Craig Kilborn from 1999 to 2004. In comedy, Kilborn is known for his deadpan delivery.

== Early life ==
Kilborn was born on August 24, 1962, in Kansas City, Missouri. His father, Hiram Kilborn, was an insurance executive, and his mother, Shirley, was a schoolteacher. When Kilborn was four years old, he and his family moved to Hastings, Minnesota, where he was raised. Kilborn was taller than his peers from an early age, eventually growing to 6 ft 4 in (1.93 m), becoming a standout on the playground basketball court as he got older. In the ninth grade, Kilborn was recruited by the Northside Magicians, an all-star basketball team in Minneapolis, Minnesota. He excelled with the Magicians and with the Hastings High School basketball team, ultimately earning three letters and multiple all-conference and all-state honors.

After graduating from high school, Kilborn accepted a scholarship to play basketball at Montana State University in Bozeman; he earned dual bachelor's degrees in media and theater arts in 1985 and has joked he "led the Big Sky Conference in turnovers" and also bench pressed 240 lb (110 kg) while training.

== Career ==
=== Media ===
Kilborn began in radio, as the CBA Savannah Spirits's play-by-play radio commentator in 1986 and 1987. He later began his television career in California as the sports anchor for Monterey County's Fox affiliate KCBA in Salinas. Some of his early on-air work included covering the Gilroy Garlic Festival and playing bocce with the locals near Cannery Row. Kilborn lived in nearby Carmel-by-the-Sea.

==== SportsCenter ====
After several small jobs, Kilborn became an ESPN SportsCenter anchor from 1993 to 1996. He was primarily the anchor of the late broadcast of SportsCenter. He made a return appearance to SportsCenter on August 8, 2004, when he co-hosted SportsCenter with Dan Patrick during ESPN's 25th Anniversary Celebration.

=== Late-night hosting ===
==== The Daily Show ====
In 1996, Kilborn became host of The Daily Show on Comedy Central. During his three-year tenure, The Daily Show was named "Best Late Night Comedy" by TV Guide. Kilborn was also nominated for a CableACE Award for Outstanding Entertainment Host. Some recurring features Kilborn created at The Daily Show included: "5 Questions", "Moment for Us", "Dance, Dance, Dance", and "Your Moment of Zen" (later hosts would continue to use the latter feature).

In a 1997 interview with Esquire, Kilborn made jokes regarding Daily Show head writer Lizz Winstead, saying, "To be honest, Lizz does find me very attractive. If I wanted her to blow me, she would." Kilborn apologized publicly and pointed out that the remarks were "said in jest", but he was suspended for a week. Winstead left the show in January 1998.

In 1998, CBS and David Letterman's production company, Worldwide Pants, selected Kilborn to replace Tom Snyder as host of The Late Late Show to run after Late Show with David Letterman. His final Daily Show episode aired on December 17, 1998, ending a 386-episode tenure. On January 11, 1999, Jon Stewart replaced Kilborn as host of The Daily Show.

On Jon Stewart's last Daily Show episode August 6, 2015, Kilborn made a cameo appearance as "Host Emeritus". It was his first appearance on the show since he left as host.

In a 2020 interview with The Athletic, Kilborn reflected on his time on The Daily Show, stating that he "had a blast" doing the show and that he was "living in New York City, hosting a comedy show, and sipping martinis at the illustrious 21 Club." He also said he "wasn't hired at Comedy Central to do a politics-heavy show, and he "would never do one — I have no interest." Kilborn credited The Daily Show for leading him to his dream job of hosting a traditional late-night show. He also said, "The Daily Show was innocently set up in a different way — they didn't hire the host first – so we inherited each other. Fortunately, most of the people were a good fit and supportive. But as much as I enjoyed it, I was always a short timer. It wasn't my show, and I wanted to do a network traditional hour format as opposed to a half-hour news parody."

In a 2026 interview on Rich Eisen's “This is SportsCenter” Podcast, Kilborn called The Daily Show “easily the most dysfunctional place I’ve worked” and said he “knew it was produced the wrong way because after I left for CBS, the problems remained and the executive producer, Madeleine Smithberg, got to work with her favorite host, Jon Stewart, and she was fired. She thought it was her show.” Kilborn added that late night shows “are host-driven shows. It’s pretty basic."

==== The Late Late Show ====
Kilborn hosted The Late Late Show for five years, changing the format to appeal to a younger audience. On the show, he popularized segments such as "Yambo" and "5 Questions". He created several characters, including Sebastian, the Asexual Icon. He also narrated his own introduction and would enter to the sound of the song "Play That Funky Music" at the beginning of his show.

In August 2004, Kilborn elected not to extend his contract. In a 2010 interview with the Los Angeles Times Kilborn said, "I didn't leave to do anything else, I left to leave. I achieved my career goals and it wasn't all it was cracked up to be", and adding that he believed the late night timeslot to be "crowded", and "the formats repetitive". Kilborn later stated in a 2019 interview with the Philadelphia Inquirer, "The main reason I left The Late Late Show was creatively I lost interest in late night comedy. The other reason was that the business side of that particular show was excessively flawed so I escaped the silliness," adding that he had "developed a specific, aristocratic comedic sensibility that didn't mesh with late night."

In a 2009 interview with the Television Academy Foundation, World Wide Pants executive Peter Lassally opined that Kilborn left the show "because he didn't get the raise he wanted." However, Kilborn stated in a 2004 interview with Daily Variety that "[The Late Late Show] was easily the greatest job I've had, and CBS was very generous in their offer to re-sign me."

Kilborn's last episode of The Late Late Show aired on August 27, 2004. The Scottish comedian Craig Ferguson took over the show on January 3, 2005."

==== The Kilborn File ====
Craig Kilborn returned to television on June 28, 2010 after six years off the air, when his new half-hour show The Kilborn File debuted on select Fox stations. The show aired for a six-week test run on a 7:00pm time slot in most markets, but was not well received. Christine Lakin was his sidekick. The show brought back many of the hallmark segments from his time on The Daily Show and The Late Late Show, such as "5 Questions" and a segment similar to "Yambo" (with some minor rule changes and a name change to "Kilbo" and later to "Kilbyashi"). The show was not renewed.

=== Movies ===
In the movie Old School (2003), Kilborn played Mark, the philandering boyfriend of Ellen Pompeo's character. In the 2006 film The Benchwarmers, he played Jerry, the bully to Jon Heder, David Spade, and Rob Schneider's nerdy roles.

==== The Life Golden ====
In July 2026, Variety reported that Kilborn is set to make his directorial film debut with The Life Golden, an independent murder mystery starring Kilborn, Lauren German, Tom Byrne, Kevin Pollak and Rainey Qualley. Kilborn also wrote the screenplay. The film follows Griffin Fairhurst Gates (Kilborn), a reclusive and eccentric former television personality whose carefully curated life in the Hollywood Hills is disrupted by a shocking crime that draws him into an unexpected mystery.

=== Other work ===
In 2011, Kilborn played the villain in an episode of Chuck during its final season.

Kilborn guest hosted The Artie Lange Show on November 6–8, 2013.

He appeared in a TV commercial for Kraft Macaroni & Cheese in 2016.

Since 2022, Kilborn has hosted a podcast entitled The Life Gorgeous.

== Filmography ==
=== Film ===
Year	Title	Role	Notes
2003	Pauly Shore Is Dead	Himself	
2003	Old School	Mark	
2005	Cursed	Himself	
2006	The Shaggy Dog	Baxter	
2006	The Benchwarmers	Jerry McDowell	
2007	Full of It	Mike Hanbo	
2014	The Extendables	Kilborn	
2015	The Bronze	Heath Parker	
2027	The Life Golden	TBA (Post-production)	director

=== Television ===
Year	Title	Role	Notes
1993–1997	SportsCenter	Himself	500 episodes
1996–1998	The Daily Show	Himself (host)	386 episodes; also, writer
1999–2004	The Late Late Show with Craig Kilborn	Himself (host)	1,190 episodes; also, writer
1999	The Bold and the Beautiful	Nurse	Episode: "1.307"
1999	Martial Law	Lewis	Episode: "The Friendly Skies"
2000	JAG	Himself	Episode: "JAG TV"
2001	Yes, Dear	Himself	Episode: "Kentucky Top Hat"
2002	Resurrection Blvd.	Himself	Episode: "En un Momento"
2010	The Kilborn File	Himself (host)	30 episodes; also creator, writer, executive producer
2011	Chuck	Roger Bale	Episode: "Chuck versus the Zoom"
2015	BoJack Horseman	Michael Morgan (voice)	Episode: "Chickens"
2017	Workaholics	Kurt Fossil	Episode: "Party Gawds"
2020	United We Fall	Dr. Sharpe	Episode: "My Favorite Marta"

== Bibliography ==
- The Daily Show's Five Questions from Comedy Central (Andrews McMeel Publishing, 1998) ISBN 978-0836253252

== Awards and nominations ==
Year	Award	Nominated work	Result
1997	CableACE Award for Best Entertainment Host	The Daily Show	Nominated
2003	Teen Choice Award for Choice TV – Late Night	The Late Late Show with Craig Kilborn	Nominated
2004	Teen Choice Award for Choice TV: Late Night	The Late Late Show with Craig Kilborn	Nominated
