= Tom Snyder =

American television and radio personality (1936–2007)

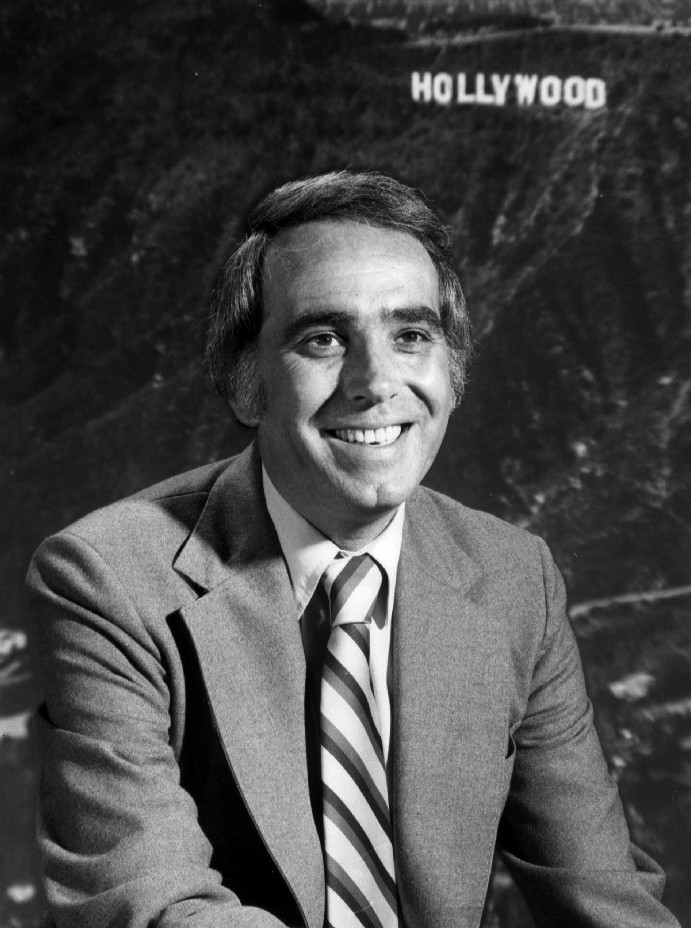
- Snyder as host of Tomorrow in 1977
- Born: Thomas James Snyder; May 12, 1936; Milwaukee, Wisconsin, U.S.
- Died: July 29, 2007 (aged 71); Belvedere, California, U.S.
- Education: Marquette University
- Years active: 1955–2005
- Notable credits: The Late Late Show with Tom Snyder; The Tomorrow Show; NBC Nightly News
- Spouse: Mary Ann Bendel (m. 1958; div. 1975)
- Children: 1

Thomas James Snyder (May 12, 1936 – July 29, 2007) was an American television personality, news anchor, and radio personality best known for his late night talk shows Tomorrow, on NBC in the 1970s and 1980s, and The Late Late Show with Tom Snyder, on CBS in the 1990s. Snyder was also the pioneer anchor of the prime time NBC News Update, in the 1970s and early 1980s, which was a one-minute capsule of news updates.

== Early life ==
Snyder was born in Milwaukee, Wisconsin, to Frank and Marie Snyder, who were of German, Dutch, and Irish descent. He received a Roman Catholic upbringing, attending St. Agnes Elementary School and graduating from Jesuit-run Marquette University High School. He then attended Marquette University, after which he had originally planned to study medicine and become a doctor. He graduated in 1959 with a major in journalism.

== Newscasting career ==
Snyder loved radio since he was a child and at some point he changed his field of study from pre-med to journalism. He once told Milwaukee Journal Sentinel reporter Tim Cuprisin that broadcasting became more important to him than attending classes, and he skipped a lot of them. Snyder began his career as a radio reporter at WRIT (now WJOI) in Milwaukee and at WKZO in Kalamazoo (where he was fired by John Fetzer) in the 1950s. For a time he worked at Savannah, Georgia, AM station WSAV (later WBMQ).

Snyder moved into television in the 1960s; he talked about driving cross-country in an early Corvair from Atlanta to Los Angeles around 1963. After a year-long stint in a news job at KTLA, he became a news anchor for KYW-TV (now WKYC-TV) in Cleveland in 1964. In 1965, when Westinghouse Broadcasting moved KYW-TV back to Philadelphia as the result of an FCC ruling, Snyder went along and remained in Philadelphia for five years.

In July 1970, Snyder returned to Los Angeles and joined NBC News, who assigned him to anchor the 6:00 pm (Pacific time) weeknight newscast on KNBC. Snyder remained in this capacity even after NBC launched the Tomorrow show with him as host in October 1973, working alongside Tom Brokaw, Jess Marlow and Paul Moyer at the KNBC anchor desk. Another KNBC broadcaster, Kelly Lange, later became Snyder's regular substitute guest host on the Tomorrow program, prior to the hiring of co-host Rona Barrett in the program's last year. Snyder moved to New York City in late 1974, taking the Tomorrow program with him and kept his hand in news, anchoring weeknight newscasts on WNBC-TV until 1977, and Sunday broadcasts of NBC Nightly News during 1975 and 1976.

Snyder returned to local news in 1982 after ending Tomorrow, to become an anchor at WABC-TV in New York City. In 1985, he returned to Los Angeles but stayed with ABC, to anchor at KABC-TV.

== Tomorrow with Tom Snyder ==
Snyder gained national fame as the host of Tomorrow with Tom Snyder (more commonly known as The Tomorrow Show), which aired late nights after The Tonight Show on NBC from 1973 to 1982. It was a talk show unlike the usual late-night fare, with Snyder, cigarette in hand, alternating between asking hard-hitting questions and offering personal observations that made the interview seem more like a conversation.

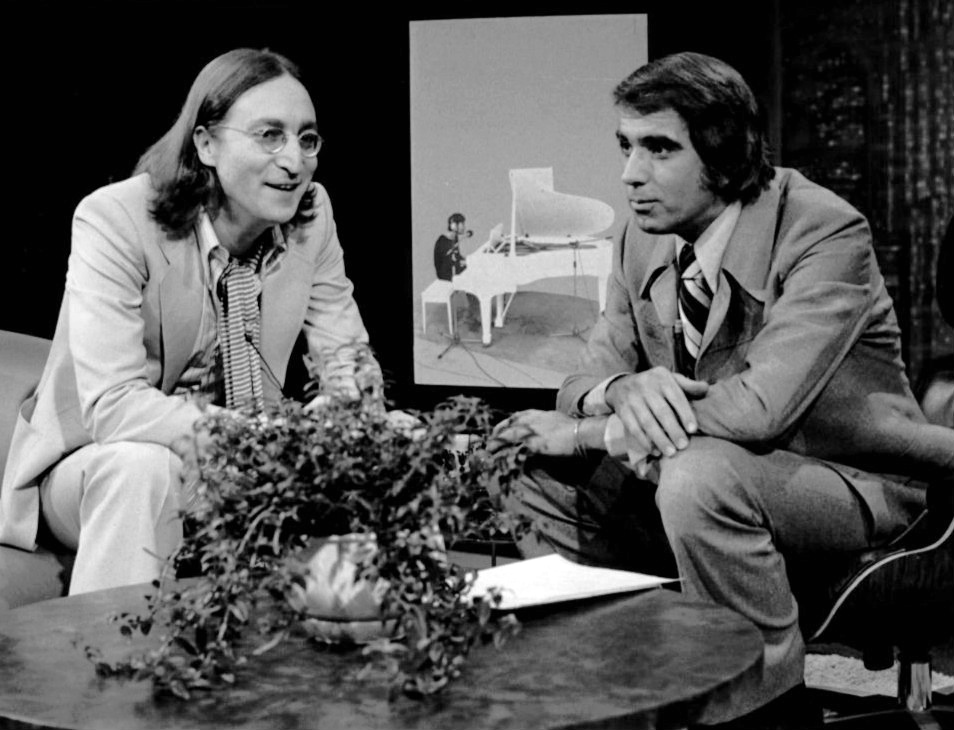
Snyder interviewing John Lennon in 1975

Unique one-on-one exchanges were common to the program, notably with John Lennon in 1975, John Lydon of PiL and the Sex Pistols in 1980, Charles Manson in 1981, actor and writer Sterling Hayden, author Harlan Ellison, and author and philosopher Ayn Rand. A one-on-one program with David Brenner as the sole guest revealed that Snyder and Brenner worked together on several documentaries. In 1981, "Weird Al" Yankovic had his first appearance on national TV performing "Another One Rides the Bus".

An infamous edition of The Tomorrow Show broadcast on October 31, 1979, saw Snyder interview the rock group Kiss. During the episode, a visibly irritated Gene Simmons (bass) and Paul Stanley (guitar) tried to contain the bombastic (and drunk) Ace Frehley (lead guitar), whose nonstop laughter and joking overshadowed the rest of the band. Snyder and Peter Criss (drummer) were obviously enjoying it though, chiming in with several jokes, much to Frehley's delight, and Simmons' disgust. Criss made repeated references to his large gun collection, to the chagrin of Simmons. Some of the footage from this show was later included on the Kissology—The Ultimate KISS Collection Vol. 2: 1978–1991 (2007) DVD.

In the late 1970s, Snyder interviewed Disney animator Ward Kimball regarding his toy train collection and his full-size trains. Snyder appeared to be as happy as a "kid in a candy store," picking up various locomotives and asking lots of questions. Snyder's love of toy trains started with his first Lionel locomotive, a scale steam switcher, which he claimed never worked too well. His collection was later donated to a New Jersey toy train club, the NJ Hi-Railers.

When not grilling guests, Snyder would often joke around with offstage crewmen, often breaking out in the distinctively hearty laugh that was the basis of Dan Aykroyd's impersonation of Snyder on Saturday Night Live (12 occasions, 1976–79 and 1995). Following a disastrous experiment with turning Tomorrow into a more typical talk show—renaming it Tomorrow Coast to Coast and adding a live audience and co-host Rona Barrett (all of which Snyder resented)—the show was canceled in fall 1981, to make way for the up-and-coming young comedian David Letterman, after Snyder turned down moving to the 1:30 to 2:30 am time slot after Letterman.

== After Tomorrow ==
In 1982, Snyder joined WABC-TV in New York, anchoring the 5 pm Eyewitness News program with Kaity Tong. He stayed at WABC for two years, then returned to the talk format in 1985 at KABC-TV in Los Angeles with a local afternoon show. He had hoped to syndicate the program nationally the following year, but those plans were scratched after Oprah Winfrey's Chicago-based syndicated show entered the market first and took over Snyder's time slot on KABC-TV.

In 1988, Snyder inaugurated a similar three-hour program on ABC Radio. The first hour was spent chatting with a celebrity guest; during the second hour Snyder engaged someone in the news; and the final hour was consumed chatting with his legion of fans. Occasionally the caller would be a well-known fan like David Letterman or Ted Koppel. One of Snyder's favorite callers was Sherman Hemsley, the actor who played George Jefferson on the hit television sitcom The Jeffersons. The Tom Snyder Show for ABC Radio Networks went off the air in late 1992.

Snyder returned to television on CNBC on January 21, 1993, adding the opportunity for viewers to call in with their own questions for his guests. Snyder nicknamed his show the Colorcast, reviving an old promotional term NBC-TV used in the early 1960s to brand its color broadcasts. He also continued his trademark of talking to offscreen crew and made frequent reference to the studio, reminding viewers of its location in Fort Lee, New Jersey. The final CNBC show aired on December 1, 1994.

== The Late Late Show with Tom Snyder ==
Meanwhile, Letterman had moved on to CBS and was given control of creating a new program to follow his at 12:35 am. Letterman, who had idolized Snyder for years, hired Snyder in 1994 as host of The Late Late Show; the announcement was made by Letterman and CBS president Howard Stringer on August 9 that Snyder's show would begin on January 9, 1995. The idea had actually begun as a running joke on Letterman's show that Snyder would soon follow him on the air as he had once followed Johnny Carson on The Tonight Show; the unlikely suggestion caught on. As part of the joke, Snyder appeared as himself in 1993 in The Larry Sanders Show episode "Life Behind Larry," in which talk-show host Sanders (Garry Shandling) steals Snyder from Letterman to host a talk-show in the slot immediately after his.

The Late Late Show with Tom Snyder aired live in the Eastern and Central Time Zones, and was simulcast to other time zones on radio to allow everyone a chance to call in. Snyder's CNBC show was taken over, largely unchanged in format, by Charles Grodin. One of the many interviews conducted on The Late Late Show was with Gloria Vanderbilt about her son's suicide, told dramatically over an entire hour. Another was a lengthy interview with Robert Blake shortly before Blake was charged with murder. When Snyder took ill with the flu, comedians Martin Mull and Jon Stewart filled in as hosts. Snyder's final Late Late Show aired on March 26, 1999. It was then reformatted for his successor Craig Kilborn, as a more traditional late night show with an audience, comic monologue, comedy segments, shorter interviews, and a greater emphasis on guests from the entertainment industry. Scottish comedian Craig Ferguson maintained a similar format when he succeeded Kilborn in 2005, though Ferguson cited Snyder as an influence in his interview style, and even experimented with an audience-less episode, in the style of Snyder's tenure, on February 23, 2010.

After stepping down from The Late Late Show, Snyder was offered a news anchor position with KCBS-TV in Los Angeles, but he declined to join the station. In February 2000, Snyder hosted two episodes of The Late Show Backstage that aired in The Late Show time slot when Letterman was recovering from heart surgery.

Snyder also hosted a documentary for TM Books & Video called A Century of Lionel Electric Trains, commemorating 100 years of Lionel Trains covering Lionel from 1900 to 2000. Part 1 featuring Lionel history from 1900 to 1945 and Part 2 featuring Lionel history from 1945 to 2000. Additionally, he hosted another program by TM Books & Video called Celebrity Train Layouts Part 2: Tom Snyder, featuring his own collection of trains.

== Colortini.com ==
Snyder posted regular messages on his own now-defunct website colortini.com during the early 2000s. A "colortini," according to Snyder in the CNBC era, was the drink you should enjoy while watching the show ("Fire up a colortini, sit back, relax, and watch the pictures, now, as they fly through the air."). For the CBS show, he redubbed the mythical drink a "simultini" as his show was also heard on selected radio stations.

On July 28, 2005, Snyder announced he was deleting his website after six years, stating: "The novelty of communicating this way has worn off." On August 1, 2005, his page was abruptly taken offline. The front page was replaced with a white screen with the simple phrase: "Colortini is gone. Thanks for the Memories." However, some have been preserved. The domain name has since been reused for other purposes.

== Personal life ==
In addition to being an avid model train collector, Snyder was also a car buff. On his radio and television programs, he would occasionally talk about current cars he owned as well as cars from the 1950s and 1960s he admired or owned in his teens and twenties. When Snyder left The Late Late Show in 1999, David Letterman gave him a white 1960 Cadillac Series 62 convertible as a going-away present.

== Final years and death ==
In April 2005, Snyder revealed that he had been diagnosed with chronic lymphocytic leukemia. In June 2006, he sold his home in the Benedict Canyon area of Los Angeles, where he had lived for almost 30 years, and relocated to Belvedere, in the San Francisco Bay Area, where he owned a second home.

Snyder died of complications from leukemia on July 29, 2007, at his Belvedere home at the age of 71.

== Legacy ==
Snyder was posthumously inducted into the Broadcast Pioneers of Philadelphia Hall of Fame in 2008. A documentary "Tom Who" is in the works. He is played by Ed Helms in A Futile and Stupid Gesture.

== Credits ==
=== Television ===
Year(s)	Title	Role	Notes
1961	The Rifleman	Pete	Episode: "A Friend in Need"
1966–1970	Contact	Himself (host)	local talk show on KYW-TV in Philadelphia
1973–1982	The Tomorrow Show	Himself (host)	
1977	McCloud	Himself	Episode: "McCloud Meets Dracula"
1979–1980	Prime Time Sunday / Saturday	Himself (host)	news magazine show on NBC
1980	Tom Snyder's Celebrity Spotlight	Himself (host)	celebrity interview show on NBC
1986	Tom Snyder	Himself (host)	local talk show on KABC-TV in Los Angeles
1993	The Larry Sanders Show	Himself	Episode: "Life Behind Larry"
1993–1994	Tom Snyder	Himself (host)	talk show on CNBC cable channel
1995–1999	The Late Late Show with Tom Snyder	Himself (host)	
1996	Dave's World	Himself	Episode: "L.A. Times"
1997	Murphy Brown	Himself	Episode: "And That's the Way It Was?"
1997	Ink	Himself	Episode: "Face Off"
1997	Life... and Stuff	Himself	Episode: "Life... and Fisticuffs"
2000	Late Show with David Letterman	Himself (guest host)	hosted two "Late Show Backstage" shows

=== Radio ===
Year(s)	Title	Role	Notes
1987	Larry King Show	Himself (guest host)	
1988–1992	Tom Snyder Radio Show	Himself (host)	talk show on the ABC Radio Network
1995–1999	The Late Late Radio Show	Himself (host)	simulcast of The Late Late Show with Tom Snyder; pre- and post-show co-hosted by Elliott Forrest
