= List of David Letterman sketches =

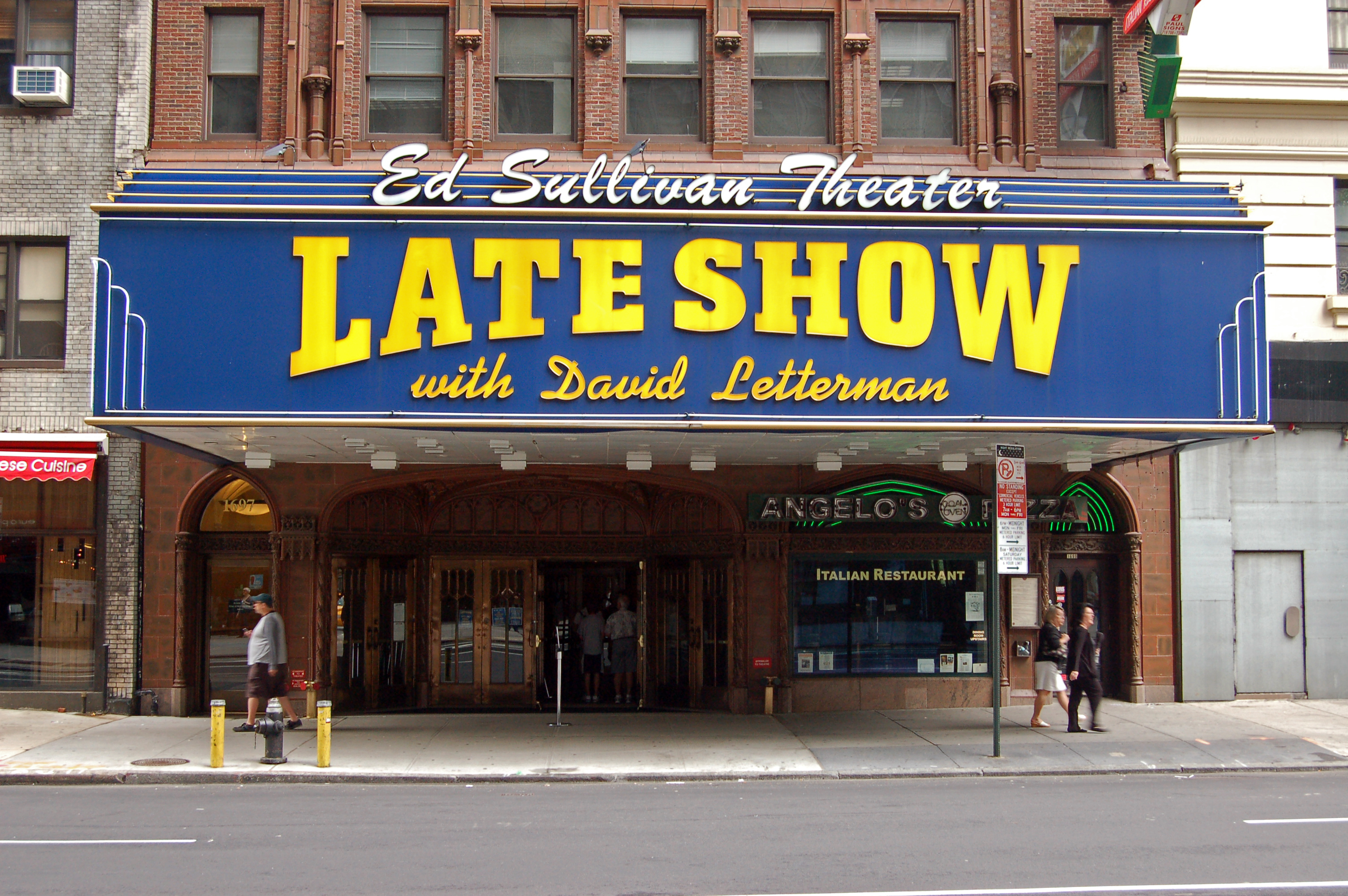
The Ed Sullivan Theater in Manhattan, where Late Show was taped, June 2009

CBS's Late Show with David Letterman regularly featured different sketches which followed the monologue and preceded interviews with guests. Often they were repeated absurdist segments involving various cast members, Letterman's friends, audience participation, edited or contrived news or promotional videos, or competitions and stunts staged outside the Ed Sullivan Theater in Manhattan, New York. Many of the same sketches originally debuted on Letterman's two previous series, NBC's Late Night with David Letterman and The David Letterman Show.

The show's regularly scheduled segments consisted of "Small Town News" on Mondays and "Fun Facts" on Fridays. Thursdays often featured a rotating set of three audience participation segments: "Know Your Current Events", "Stump the Band", and "Audience Show and Tell." "Stupid Pet Tricks" and "Stupid Human Tricks", two of Letterman's trademark bits from Late Night, continued to be presented on the Late Show, although much less frequently.

There were also running gags which often continued for about a month like playing José Feliciano's "Old Turkey Buzzard" or other sound effects when a card "crashes through the window", telephone calls from "Len Easton, California Highway Patrol", or Joe McCain on a telephone which Letterman acknowledges is a prop that is not connected. Letterman expresses amusement or annoyance during these recurring events.

These are sketches which have been featured on the Late Show with David Letterman.

== Kalter introduction ==
Announcer Alan Kalter's (and before him, Bill Wendell's) introduction of Letterman, while technically not a skit, assigned a bizarre modification to Letterman's name and appears at the beginning of every show. ("And now: Microscopic Sea Creature, David Letterman!") Letterman's title changes every night and often makes reference to a current event. ("And now: Disenfranchised French Youth, David Letterman!")

Prior to September 11, 2001, the first line of Wendell's and Kalter's introductions contained humorous descriptions of New York City ("From New York! Where the rats hate the subways, too!"). Once the Late Show returned to air on September 17, 2001, the introduction changed simply to, "From New York! The greatest city in the world!" That remained the standard introduction for over ten years; however, "The greatest city in the world!" is omitted from episodes with guest hosts, as is the host 'title'. In 2011, Kalter took to shortening 'David' to 'Dave' in his introduction of Letterman. At some point prior to late 2012, he once again returned to using 'David'. Beginning on January 2, 2013, the introduction began "From the heart of Broadway, broadcasting across the nation and around the world!", while Kalter also included a brief self-introduction of himself ("I'm Alan Kalter") after introducing Paul Shaffer & The CBS Orchestra.

== Sketch participants ==
While Letterman himself often participated in many of the show's non-"desk comedy" routines in its earlier years (as well as on Late Night), over time he increasingly preferred to have others star in them instead. Later he was rarely featured in any of the show's frequent pre-taped bits. Kalter, bandleader and sidekick Paul Shaffer, and Hello Deli proprietor Rupert Jee were often used instead in comedy routines, as was stage manager Biff Henderson, stagehands Pat Farmer and Kenny Sheehan, handyman George Clarke, "cue card boy" Tony Mendez, head carpenter Harold Larkin, cameraman Dave Dorsett, assistant Stephanie Birkitt, former writers Gerard Mulligan and Chris Elliott (who almost always appeared together), and Johnny Dark (a personal comedy friend of Letterman's).

Letterman's mother, Dorothy, also made appearances (via satellite from Indianapolis) from time to time including each Thanksgiving. Perhaps her rise to fame was mostly as a result of her nightly reporting from the 1994 Winter Olympics in Lillehammer, Norway.

Former recurring players from the show included Mujibur Rahman and Sirajul Islam (employees of a nearby gift store which moved once prior to Rahman and Islam appearing for a last appearance in January 2003) Their business closed a decade after they debuted on Letterman's show. Other people who appeared in sketches were Calvert DeForest (a.k.a. Larry "Bud" Melman), and scenic designer Kathleen Ankers (reprising her Late Night role of "Peggy, the Foulmouthed Chambermaid"; on CBS, she was the equally censored "Helen, the Ill-tempered Ticket Lady").

Random cameo appearances were made during the span of the show, most notably in the earlier years by Tony Randall, with Regis Philbin later filling that void. For a while, Letterman took great delight in making fun of his employer, continuing a tradition established at NBC, with senior CBS Corporation executive Les Moonves often serving as the target of his ire. In time, Letterman's relationship with Moonves improved; a segment titled "More with Les" featured jocular phone calls between Letterman and Moonves.

=== Alan Kalter ===
Announcer Alan Kalter was frequently used in comedy bits, often with Kalter being the butt of the joke:

Kalter the Pervert
In some skits, Kalter is portrayed as a deluded sexual deviant, often referring to himself as "Big Red." Letterman frequently followed them up by jokingly commenting to Shaffer on Kalter's disturbing, sickening nature, while Kalter grins mischievously. Often such skits began with Letterman informing the audience that Kalter had approached Letterman prior to the show (about which Letterman often adds, "I've asked him not to do that"), and explaining that Kalter had asked to comment on a current news or pop cultural event.

Kalter then begins a monologue where he speaks directly to the camera, setting up the nature of the topic (often the separation of a public couple) in a serious manner. He then addresses a separate, closer camera in a sexually provocative manner as amorous music plays in the background. The material is often a series of double entendres, with Kalter offering to romantically console the woman who is the center of the problem and ends with him making passionate moans. A disturbed Letterman then interrupts Kalter and chides him for behaving inappropriately. Kalter often ends the bit by making a provocative quip to Letterman and then rips off his headset and exits the stage in a "huff."

Kalterworld
Occasionally, Kalter used his segments to promote "Kalterworld", a supposed web site selling "the finest in adult toys, games, and novelties." The Kalterworld.com url leads to the official Late Show web site.

"Alan Kalter Makes Your Product Sound Sexy"
Kalter promotes an actual commercial product (for example Ajax) in a provocative and suggestive manner. He then pours the product on his head and smears it on his body, often moaning as he does so and then screaming in pain as it gets into his eyes. A bland voice-over then encourages companies to participate in the segment by submitting their own product to a particular address.

Kalter the Singer
Kalter is introduced with the implication that he will provide a serious commentary on current events, but instead exuberantly sings a contemporary pop song filled with sexual innuendos (often from the female perspective). Songs included "My Humps" on "Alan Kalter's Political Roundup", "Don't Cha" on "Alan Kalter's Mideast Update" and "London Bridge." As he performs, Kalter struts across the stage with a disturbed and annoyed Letterman visible at his desk finally exiting at the other side.

Kalter Gets Maimed
The show will often employ bits where severe bodily harm is supposedly inflicted on Kalter (such as when a cocktail waitress walks across the stage in Kalter's direction and then tosses the drink into his face). He then writhes on the ground groaning and acting as if in serious pain. A wry Letterman will sometimes advise an inattentive Kalter to use a medication normally used for more mild injuries including Neosporin or Ibuprofen.

The Guy Who Beats Up Alan
In one recurring gag, Kalter makes a statement on a particular topic, only to have a large man appear from nowhere and object to Kalter's comments. He then proceeds to pummel him, which results in Kalter rolling on the ground in agony, and storms off backstage. Letterman will often amusedly ridicule the obviously fake nature of the violence, as the man's blows never come anywhere near Kalter, despite Kalter's best efforts to sell his pain. ("That last punch came at least within a foot.")

Later the beatings were followed up by pre-taped pieces, in which the relationship between Alan and the man who beats him (identified as "Brian") was shown to be more complicated. One sketch involved Kalter catching Brian being "unfaithful" by beating up another man on the street, and the two being heartbroken by the event. Another followed Brian punching Kalter in the face despite his "Not (in) the face!" pleas. After Brian storms off backstage, a video shows Brian expressing guilt to his wife or girlfriend about his abuse towards Kalter, fearing it was "pushing him away." The two later make up at the end with Brian meeting Kalter and punching him in the stomach instead of the face, much to Kalter's happiness. The videos are presented in a mock romance-drama style, with a soundtrack of emotional pop songs.

"TV's Uncle Jerry"
In 2006, Kalter began to introduce himself by saying "I'm Alan Kalter, TV's Uncle Jerry", much to Letterman's delight at first, but over time Letterman regarded the moniker with faux-irritation, which appeared to be part of the joke. In August of the same year, several weeks after the bit started, the Late Show aired a clip from a new, fake CBS domestic sitcom entitled "Oh, Brother!" where Kalter played the aforementioned "Uncle Jerry" character. In the clip, Jerry abandons babysitting his brother's children on his wedding anniversary to instead join a friend at a bar who had met two flight attendants. He then uses a would-be catch-phrase: "Hey, Uncle Jerry's gonna get busy!" Despite introducing the clip with some enthusiasm, Letterman quickly dismissed it afterwards, saying "That sucked! That just sucked!" Kalter took to introducing himself as other beloved television characters including TV's Professor Withers, TV's Johnny Mambo, and TV's Uptown Ricky Brown. He has also introduced himself as "TV's Howie Mandel", to which Letterman said that made no sense at all.

"Alan Kalter's Campaign Roundup"
A near-daily running gag presented late in the 2000 presidential election season began with Letterman introducing Kalter, who would ostensibly give a summary of the latest campaign news. Instead, Kalter would perform an energetic rendition of the chorus to "Who Let the Dogs Out?" which was a popular and ubiquitous song at the time and walk across the stage. In the skit's later occurrences, Kalter sometimes ripped off his shirt while he sang (revealing a pale and flabby physique) and adding a manic and deranged tone to his performance. Kalter has demonstrated a compulsion to disrobe in many of his other segments.

Alan Punches Someone Out
In another long-running gag, Kalter would have a problem with something said at his expense, such as a Top Ten List entry, or a letter read during the "CBS Mailbag" segment. Kalter pressed Letterman about the statement, asking "Did he really say that?" and Letterman would confirm its accuracy. Kalter would then leave the stage to hunt down the person who said it, usually higher up in the building in the Late Show offices. During his transit, an individual would often greet Kalter with "Hi, Alan!" only to be ignored. After finding the guilty party, Kalter would then punch him out and walk away with a look of satisfaction. In one instance, the person on the receiving end was Regis Philbin, who had just been shown in a "Who Wants to Be a Millionaire?" clip where a question described Kalter as "creepy."

Alan Kalter's Celebrity Interview
Occasionally after the first or second guest, Letterman turned the show over to Kalter, who was supposed to conduct an interview of his own with a celebrity. Invariably, it turns out the guest booked for "Celebrity Interview", who is seated next to Kalter, has already appeared on the show as the first or second guest earlier that night. An angry Kalter accused Letterman of deliberately booking the same person as a regular guest on the show in an attempt to sabotage Kalter's segment and steal the limelight. The sketch typically ends with Kalter storming off the stage after hurling insults at Letterman, as well as the celebrity interviewee, who usually deadpans in mock confusion or mortification.

== Regular sketches ==
When Letterman left NBC and moved to CBS to begin the Late Show in the summer of 1993, several of Late Night's long-running comedy bits made the move with him including perhaps his best known, the Top Ten List. Letterman renamed a few of his regular bits to avoid legal problems over trademark infringement (NBC claimed that what he did on Late Night was "intellectual property" of the network). For example, "Viewer Mail" on NBC became the "CBS Mailbag", and Larry "Bud" Melman began to use his real name, Calvert DeForest.

One recurring sketch on both the NBC and CBS shows has been the destruction of household items by various methods including explosives, steamrollers, and-most often-throwing them off the roof of the Ed Sullivan Theater. While it was popular with fans, Letterman gradually lessened the frequency of such segments.

Letterman also had a knack for consuming food products and drinks which appeared on his show. Among the items that he has consumed are: wine from a bottle used for a cooking demonstration; various kinds of liquor (while quipping "We're gonna lose our liquor license"); the restaurant Popeyes "Full Flavor Green Beans"; "motor oil" (actually chocolate syrup) from a bottle which bore a "Quaker State" label; Red Bull; liquid from a bottle which supposedly contained Wite-Out; pills from boxes labeled "Lipitor" and "Cialis" (obviously not really the drugs); and even cosmetic products. On one occasion, Letterman took a healthy swig of "low-carb suntan lotion" and immediately spit it out, having discovered that it actually was suntan lotion.

The Late Show was well known for its repeated absurdist segments, often taking the form of competitions or audience participation. The charm of such segments was that often they were completely pointless, yet are taken seriously by Letterman and all involved.

=== Top Ten List ===
The Top Ten List appeared almost daily on the Late Show, and remained one of the few regular segments carried over from Late Night. It is often the last comedic segment presented prior to the show's first guest. List topics are often inspired by current news and pop cultural events, with typical lists bearing titles such as "Top Ten Signs..." and "Top Ten Reasons..." The Top Ten List is compiled by the show's writing staff and is usually read by Letterman, although the show occasionally used guest presenters. Some Top Ten List themes reappeared seasonally like the carolers singing "Top Ten Least Popular Holiday Songs."

For a long time, the Top Ten Lists were said to have been written in a so-called "Home Office". There were various Home Offices before the bit was dropped, but the list included Sioux City, Iowa; Grand Rapids, Michigan; and Wahoo, Nebraska-all actual, extant towns. (Late Show staffer Mike McIntee's nightly online recap of the show, the "Wahoo Gazette", is named after the Nebraska town.)

The Top Ten List was occasionally a casualty of time constraints. For example, Letterman may announce that the Top Ten List is coming up, or Kalter will promote it before the first commercial, when, in fact, it is not delivered on that night's show and is instead held until the next morning, when it is broadcast across Westwood One/CBS Radio Network.

=== Great Moments in Presidential Speeches ===
Great Moments in Presidential Speeches was a near-daily segment which presented a series of three video excerpts. Originally, the first two come from actual famous moments, Franklin D. Roosevelt's inaugural speech ("The only thing we have to fear is fear itself") and John F. Kennedy's inaugural speech ("Ask not what your country can do for you, ask what you can do for your country").

The third excerpt featured President George W. Bush in an unintentionally comical moment, often during press conferences or town hall gatherings. The moments frequently focused on President Bush stuttering, finding himself at a loss for words, or uttering a nonsensical Bushism. The excerpts were also often taken out of context for humorous effect, such as when Bush declared, "My kids can't read!", "My lawyer's a Latino" or "Why should I care about Africa?"

The "Great Moments" presentation also featured Dwight Eisenhower, Harry S. Truman, Jimmy Carter, Ronald Reagan, Bill Clinton, and even Bush's father, followed by Bush himself. One adaptation was of President Kennedy's Berlin speech, with the words "Ich bin ein Berliner", followed by President Reagan's Berlin speech ("Mr. Gorbachev, tear down this wall") in 1987 (Reagan was also featured in another Letterman skit "The Reagan Diaries"), and as always, an excerpt from President Bush's recent speeches. An Abraham Lincoln impostor (Johnny Dark) has also given the "Tear down this wall" speech. President Lyndon Johnson made his debut on "Great Moments" with his declaration not to seek reelection in 1968. George Washington's, Abraham Lincoln's, Roosevelt's, and Kennedy's portraits were shown in the graphic at the beginning and end of "Great Moments."

After a few months into the segment's inception, the Kennedy inauguration clip began to include a Late Show staffer (often dressed in formal period garb) superimposed over the empty seat to Kennedy's right. The staffers included announcer Alan Kalter, "cue card boy" Tony "Inky" Mendez (who showed cue cards to President Kennedy), costume designer Susan Hum (whose actions included taking his picture with a disposable camera, removing lint from his shoulder, stealing his wallet, and eating a jumbo pretzel), associate producer Nancy Agostini, and stage manager Biff Henderson. All "cameos" ended with the staffers clapping along in real-time response to Kennedy's speech.

After the incident when an Iraqi journalist threw his shoes at Bush, flying shoes were shown in the introductory vignettes of the other Presidents, including shoes thrown at Abraham Lincoln giving the Gettysburg Address. The last airing of the sketch involving Bush was January 16, four days before the inauguration of President Barack Obama.

The first airing of the sketch after Obama entered office was Monday, January 26, 2009, but the Obama speech which was captured appeared to have no comedic value, thus heralding the beginning of the Obama presidency as well as fulfilling the actual purpose of the Great Moments segment. On the next GMIPS, aired January 28, 2009, President Obama's face was superimposed over the body of former President Bush in one of his speeches, pretending that Obama was speaking comically, but it was actually the voice of President Bush. After that, other sketches, such as "This Day in the Clinton Marriage", were substituted in the time slot when "Great Moments" previously appeared.

=== Will It Float? ===
An item is dropped into a tank of water by two models, often referred to by Letterman as "The Hi-Ho Girls." The segment starts out with Kalter identifying a household item that will be tested, and a faux prize that is supposedly at stake. A picture of that prize is flashed on screen for a split second. Letterman and Shaffer debate the buoyant properties of the item before they each decide on whether it will sink or float (a frequent deciding factor is the nature of the item's container).

Two models then drop the item into the tank while the Late Show "Hula Hoop Girl" (Anna Jack) and "Grinder Girl" (Kiva Kahl) perform on either side of the tank. Depending upon the outcome, large flashing words appear reading, "It Floats!" (accompanied by a ringing bell) or "It Sinks!" (accompanied by a buzzer).

Letterman often espouses the educational merit of the game in jest, citing positive feedback from parents, educators, and clergymen. He has acknowledged that while the segment is not popular with the Late Show staff, he insists on continuing it for his own amusement. Letterman joked that the skit was adapted from a similar BBC programme entitled "Is It Buoyant?" He also often advertises the (fictional) "Will It Float" home game, which "has everything you need in a box to play the game for only $19.99." The game consists only of a list of suggested household items and a bottle of water. Letterman also plugged the PlayStation 3 version of the "Will It Float?" home game, and in the past would highlight the Xbox 360 version. At one point, he gave viewers a warning to stay away from the knockoff version, "Does it Sink?", which could be found being hawked by street vendors on Canal Street. After the game is over, Letterman often addresses the women by saying he will see them at "the big 'Will It Float?' party" after the show.

=== Is This Anything? ===
In this segment, the stage curtain is raised to reveal an individual or team performing an unusual stunt, often accompanied by music from the CBS Orchestra. Flanking the performer, who varies, are two previous performers who became regulars for the segment:

- The "Hula Hoop Girl" (Anna Jack), who spins numerous hula hoops around different parts of her body, and
- The "Grinder Girl" (Kiva Kahl), who operates a hand-held grinder against metal parts of her costume, producing sparks.

After about thirty seconds the curtain is lowered and Letterman discusses with Shaffer whether the act was "something" or "nothing." As the segment continued over the course of time, Letterman would increasingly express disinterest in the featured performer, opting instead to admire the Grinder Girl. Shaffer in turn would often admit to having been too distracted with his performance of the music.

On an episode in June 2003, the curtain rose to reveal members of the Stanley Cup champion New Jersey Devils. Martin Brodeur hoisted the trophy, leading the crowd in a chant of "Devils! Devils!" Letterman and Shaffer ruled it as definitely "something."

Is This Anything lay dormant for almost a year before it was resurrected on the March 22, 2006 episode. A man balanced himself on a ladder and juggled: Paul Shaffer voted a clear "nothing", and Letterman was going to vote "something" before he noticed a safety mat. Letterman then concurred with Shaffer.

In an uncharacteristic move, Letterman invited Sharon Osbourne to assist in officiating Is This Anything on the July 26, 2007 episode, due to her involvement with America's Got Talent. The act consisted of a man balancing an aluminum ladder on his chin while riding a unicycle, and all three agreed that it was nothing.

=== Small Town News ===
Often presented on Mondays, Letterman presents a series of actual news items, advertisements, and police blotter excerpts which are shown to be unintentionally humorous. In earlier incarnations, these items would be the setup for a punchline from Letterman, and Letterman would occasionally tell the audience to "please wait for the humorous comment." "Small Town News" was a segment that began on The David Letterman Show in 1980 and continued through his tenure on Late Night and the Late Show. For most of the run of the Late Show, Letterman dropped the punchlines, thereby making the sketch nearly identical to Headlines, a sketch on Jay Leno's programs which relied on the news items themselves being the punchline. Letterman long stated that he believed Leno stole the concept from Letterman.

=== Audience participation games ===
Thursday episodes usually include one of three rotating variations of audience participation segments. Each game starts with Letterman making small talk with each of the featured audience members, asking about their background and occupations, often with humorous results. When the individual has completed their portion, they are given a gift certificate to a local restaurant as well as random gift items. Occasionally, the participant is a ringer from the show staff.

Know Your Current Events
In what Letterman describes as "America's Fastest Growing Quiz Sensation", a "contestant" is chosen from the audience to play a quiz game. He or she first chooses a category. Besides the title category, there are often a total of "six big ways to win big", with other categories being topical and often esoteric, and rarely reappearing. Some of these have included "Know Your Home Depot Locations in Delaware", "Know Your Late Show Production Accountant Joe DeGeorge", "Know Your Department Store Return Policies", and "Know Your Shocking Facts about Peter Jennings." Some categories are merely for show; in the event a fake category is picked, Letterman will encourage the contestant to pick a different category.

A regular category is "Know Your Cuts of Meat", which itself consists of five categories: beef, lamb, veal, pork, and "variety meats", as Shaffer heavily accentuates when he chuckles and says, "Variety meats, David." After playing, the individual is also rewarded with a box of assorted meat cuts from "Lobel's: pound for pound, the finest butcher shop in the world."

Throughout the course of the segment's history on the show, Letterman varied back and forth between discreetly feeding the contestants the answers, and making them guess. Each selected category is accompanied by a brief theme song, based on Nobody But Me.

Stump the Band
This is a variation of the segment from Johnny Carson's (and earlier, Jack Paar's) tenure on The Tonight Show. A pre-selected audience member requests an obscure song from the CBS Orchestra, which then performs a humorous pre-scripted song based only on the title of the requested song (often a parody of a more popular song). The band will then jokingly insist that they have correctly played the song, only to be told otherwise by the individual, who then performs the actual song. The novelty song "Wadaliacha" is a recurring joke on the show, having been suggested multiple times, but yet never performed right. However, on more than one occasion, the audience member affirmed that the band correctly performed the song, which always surprised Letterman and Shaffer, since the performances were meant to be humorously inaccurate. These segments often feature a segment with Shaffer in character as Carnac the Magnificent, another Carson carryover.

Audience Show and Tell
This revolves around a pre-selected audience member relating an anecdote, presenting a personal item of note, or demonstrating a hidden talent.

=== Fun Facts ===
Usually presented on Fridays, the segment consists of Letterman reading a series of trivia, records, and statistics. Letterman explains that the "Fun Facts" are submitted to the show each week by "Gary Sherman", the head of the fictional "Federal Bureau of Miscellaneous Information" (FBMI) and a supposed acquaintance of Shaffer whom Letterman claims he met at Shaffer's wedding. The segment often begins with Letterman presenting a few real facts to set up the premise (although they are often of a humorous nature in their own right and are mistaken by some audience members as made-up). He then presents several humorous, fictional "facts." Most of these are of an absurdist nature, such as "The first pair of binoculars had a 1x magnification", or "For a short amount of time, the rock band The Who broke up, and formed two new bands called The When and The What." An irrelevant fictitious promotional announcement of some kind is mixed in on occasion, much to Letterman's confusion.

The segment was initially presented on the show sporadically before being made a regular weekly feature. Letterman is also promoting a Fun Facts book (unlike the Will it Float? game, a real book, ISBN 978-1-4013-2307-3).

=== Hello Deli Games ===
A camera crew is sent to Rupert Jee in the neighboring Hello Deli, where Jee is asked to invite a potential player from the crowd outside. The player introduces him or herself, relates his or her background, and is told what prize is to be won. Regardless of the outcome, the player is also awarded a "Hello Deli Platter" by the Hi-Ho Girls.

Recurring games include "Beat the Clock"—echoing the title of a game show from the early days of television—in which the confused player helplessly attempts to stop a clock from counting down to zero (no instructions are ever given on how this might be accomplished -- players usually try yelling "Stop!", to no avail) and "What's on the iPod?", in which Jee tunelessly sings along to a song on his iPod and the contestant has to guess what song he is listening to.

Other games involve a player searching for a hidden item in the deli, and guessing the nature of an item obscured under an item of clothing worn by Jee (such as a Hillary Clinton-esque pantsuit). Occasionally, the supposed player is a "plant" and the segment ends when the "player" appears to be severely injured. Johnny Dark has appeared, under various names, as the contestant, in which case the routine consists of him asking so many questions that there is no time for the game itself. Biff Henderson has hosted similar games on the street.

=== Stupid Pet Tricks/Stupid Human Tricks ===
These segments were carried over from Late Night, and consisted of three pre-selected participants (or in the case of "Pet Tricks", pets and their owners), who each demonstrate an unusual talent or stunt on the stage. Letterman often preceded the segment with the tongue-in-cheek warning: "Remember, this is not a competition, it is only an exhibition—please, no wagering." While still a trademark feature of the Late Show, the segment has been featured on a more sporadic basis in recent years. The show's regular "Audience Show and Tell" bit will often include an audience member performing a "Stupid Human Trick"-type act.

=== Explod-O-Pop ===
Explod-O-Pop is a brand of popping corn, and is usually given as a prize to the participants of the audience participation games. Letterman often describes the product using various slogans such as "America's Only Atomic Popping Corn", "It's Carbolicious", and "It's Contaminated with Flavor!"

It was available at CBS's online store, with the proceeds benefitting the American Foundation for Courtesy and Grooming, a charity of Letterman's which contributes its proceeds to a wide variety of foundations, most of which are of a health, youth, or educational nature.

=== Audience sweep ===
Late in the show, a short segment will consist of a camera panning across the audience as it applauds during the break. A comedy piece will usually be superimposed above this video; in most cases this is either a graphic presenting a game or announcement narrated by Kalter, or a comedy piece featuring Kalter himself. Since returning from the hiatus caused by the 2007–08 Writers Guild of America strike, however these segments later featured a Kalter voice-over promoting future guests, concluded by a phrase such as "Get your VCRs ready!"

Games

Games often consist of parodies of simple time-killers such as word jumbles or quizzes. One example consists of the viewer being shown a short jumble where the letters are barely mixed up, seemingly making for an obvious answer. When the letters are supposedly shuffled into their "correct" order, the answer will actually consist of a completely different, longer set of letters.

Announcements

Some examples of announcements include "Late Show Reminders" (advising viewers to set their VCR for an "upcoming" episode featuring guests that have already appeared earlier that very night), "contest winners" (such as a supposed "My Pet Looks Like Dave" contest), and promotions for "all-new" episodes of old CBS shows, such as Jake and the Fatman.

Bored Kalter

A common example of Kalter's audience sweep comedy bits consists only of a silent and apathetic Kalter engaging in some mundane activity, such as eating or shaving.

=== The Quiz Machine ===
During the mid-1990s a frequent Late Show routine was The Quiz Machine, a large device wheeled out onto the stage, which progressively got bigger and more advanced as weeks went on. The Quiz Machine contained answers to questions that Letterman had on his note cards, and would be revealed by contestants pushing buttons or pulling levers. Frequently the machine failed to work, adding to its humor. In a notable appearance by Bill Gates, dressed in lab coat and hard hat, he joked that if Microsoft would have invented a machine this bad, he would have it recalled.

== Non-regular sketches ==
7-Eleven Giveaways
Letterman introduces a man claiming to be James Keyes, President and CEO of 7-Eleven, who then announces to the audience and viewers of the convenience store's latest promotional tie-in with the Late Show. The announcements first began with a commemoration of the date of July 11, 2006 ("7-11"), when all 7-Eleven stores would supposedly give away free Slurpees, hot dogs, and muffins to anyone who said "Dave sent me!" (all items were said to be paid for by Letterman). Since then, the man portraying Keyes (actor Roger Rathburn) has sporadically appeared, enthusiastically announcing other food item giveaways and lavish prize drawings. After the man walks off stage, Shaffer then asks Letterman if the man really is president and CEO of 7-Eleven, only to have Letterman reluctantly admit that he is not.

"Action News"
Letterman will occasionally interrupt a bit for "Action News", a bit which mocks "teaser" promos for local newscasts. Letterman will look to the camera to his left and read a fake news headline with an ostensibly disingenuous smile and cheery demeanor. On the screen, in the style of a newscast, appears a news graphic next to Letterman's face and the legend "Dave Letterman, Action News" at the bottom of the screen. After delivering the headline, Letterman will then turn to the camera to his right and deliver another fake headline. He then "promotes" Action News ("That's all coming up tonight on 'Action News.'") and returns to the original bit as if nothing had happened. Occasionally, a weather reporter from an actual CBS affiliate will also deliver a pre-recorded fake weather tease. "Action News" most frequently interrupts "Fun Facts", although it occasionally interrupts other bits, including the Top Ten List. "Action News" began appearing in early 2008.

Cameraman Dave Dorsett Leaves the Theatre
During the segment of the show after the monologue, Letterman will be setting up a comedy bit when the camera trained on him begins to drift downward and stops with Letterman's head out of frame. Letterman will continue for several seconds before noticing the camera's new position, when he stops his bit and asks the cameraman, Dave Dorsett, what is happening. Dorsett explains that he has to leave the theatre for one reason or another (normally tied to a hyped event such as a new movie or video game release), and speaks of his disdain for the show as he exits through the guest entrance. The camera remains in its resting position for the remainder of the segment, causing Letterman to have to lean down and turn his head sideways to get into the shot. In another variation, Dorsett will not leave the studio, but will be preoccupied with something else, such as reading. When the show returns from commercial, the camera shot is back to normal.

Campaign 2000
Throughout the summer and fall of 2000, Dave and the cast (featuring producer Maria Pope) would ostensibly recap the latest on the presidential campaign between Al Gore and George W. Bush. An opening animation would roll accompanied by the orchestra, after which Alan Kalter would read a series of "sponsors", which included party ice (available in clear, semi-clear and opaque), the "ComposTumbler", onetime informercial sensation Hairagami and the then-new "Liquid Plumbr Foaming Pipe Snake". One of the most notable (and well-worn) bits from this segment was a video clip of then-candidate Bush whispering (despite an open lavalier microphone) to Dick Cheney that a reporter was a "major league asshole", to which Cheney chuckled back "Oh, big time." Outside this, however, it was common for Campaign 2000 to include no campaign-related content whatsoever.

Coincidentally, this was the same summer in which Survivor achieved its initial meteoric success. Campaign 2000 segments on days after new Survivor episodes (usually Monday, but occasionally other days) were broadcast, soon included that week's eliminated castaway. Letterman often feigned disinterest with the castoffs, forcing them to stand next to Pope at the producer's podium; in fact, only one contestant, Elisabeth Filarski from Survivor: The Australian Outback, was ever invited to sit in a guest chair. Generally Letterman would ask the contestants irrelevant, nonsensical questions; over time, he began to work Stephanie Birkitt into the segment, initially calling her upstairs in the office and later having her appear on stage in costume. She would routinely ask the castaways, "Did you see or touch any monkeys?" to which Letterman would scold her. As time passed, she would promise, increasingly vehemently, not to ask the question and then ask it anyway.

For reasons unknown, the Campaign 2000 segment would appear at first regularly and then sporadically into 2001 (retaining the name "Campaign 2000"); Letterman would feign exasperation at discovering its inclusion in the show, open the segment, and immediately close it without any of the "sponsors" or jokes.

"CBS Mailbag"
A Late Show staple on Fridays (originally Thursdays) until it was phased out in Letterman's later years (the last time it aired was December 3, 2004), the CBS Mailbag carried on the Late Night tradition of taking actual viewer letters (usually four at a time), and responding to each of them with a pre-written comedy routine. The segment was a carryover from Late Night, where it was known by the name "Viewer Mail"; NBC kept the segment when Letterman moved to CBS, though he quickly revived it under the "CBS Mailbag" name. "Please Mr. Postman" was the segment's theme song for the last few years (replacing the "We Get Letters" theme from The Perry Como Show that was originally used).

"Charts and Graphs"
Letterman displays poster boards with various charts and graphs, usually with the last element on each being the absurd one. (Pie Chart: What will be the top priority of the next president? 43%: Stabilizing Iraq. 31%: Stabilizing climate change. 26% Stabilizing The View.)

"A Day in the Life of..." (such as "A Day in the Life of George W. Bush")
A slide show with the time of day indicated on each slide, accompanied by a humorous caption, such as "4:30 p.m. Receives FTD's 'Good Luck Bouquet' from Osama bin Laden", "5:30 p.m. Yoo-Hoo break", "6:00 p.m. Nap."

"Fun with Rupert"
One of the most popular pre-taped pieces during the show's earlier years was a Candid Camera-style bit which featured the normally mild-mannered Rupert Jee interacting with ordinary, unsuspecting people around the city. Letterman-usually hidden in a van-would covertly observe the action and provide a disguised Jee (wearing a cap, glasses, backpack, and headphones) with ad-libbed instructions via two-way communication. This resulted in Jee performing humorous and unusual antics while amusing, confusing, and in some cases irritating, various victims. The segment was discontinued after an unaired incident in which Letterman would only explain that a man had pulled a knife on Jee. It was unofficially revived in a few live bits in 2006 where Jee (not in disguise) would visit a neighboring restaurant and perform similar antics.

George Clarke's "It's a Fact"
Handyman Clarke is seen backstage, bloodied and severely injured from an earlier incident. He addresses the camera, indirectly explaining the incident by imparting advice such as "Women on the street don't like to be called 'Candy Pants.'" He will then point to the camera and say, "It's a fact!"

The Guy Who Swears at Dave
A man, often portraying a Late Show staffer, calls out Letterman, expressing his irritation with him. He then addresses Kalter and Shaffer in turn, flipping off each while shouting something that is bleeped. He then repeats this with Letterman, using both hands and repeating the same phrase with extra emphasis. He then storms away, much to the shock of the three men. One time, after Letterman and Shaffer decided that an "Is This Anything" act was nothing, the performer turned out to be the Guy, who then went into that routine. After a Stupid Pet Trick, in which a dog barked at someone giving it the finger, Dave said that he hoped the dog would not run into the Guy backstage, but in the segue before the next commercial, they were together.

"How Many Guys in... Suits Can Get into a ...?"
Examples include "How Many Guys in Spider-Man Suits Can Get Into a Jamba Juice?" and "How Many Guys in Pirate Costumes Can Fit Into A Sandwich Shop?" As the title indicates, the camera is focused on a local establishment, and Dave counts the number of persons wearing the costumes entering the store (first one at a time, then "send in 5 more") until the store is crowded. The bit usually ends with persons in other random costumes being sent in, like a horse, tooth fairy, panda bear or wizard.

"Late Show Equations"
Similar in concept to "Charts and Graphs", except there is a slide covering the comic answer to the equation. ("A rollercoaster + the smell of goat = New York City cab ride.")

"NBC 4 News Update"
A portion of a news report from WNBC in New York City is aired and then at the very end of the clip is punctuated by Sue Simmons's infamous "What the (censored) are you doing?" outburst.

"On 53rd Street"
A daredevil demonstrates his or her skills outside the theater (like Tony Hawk performing skateboarding jumps), a half-ton pumpkin is exploded on the street, or dogs compete in the Diving Dog Competition (in which the dogs long jump into a pool). The remainder of one show was canceled when a snowboarder was injured while performing a stunt.

Osama bin Laden Tapes
Usually on the heels of recent news reports of actual propaganda video announcements released by bin Laden or Al-Qaeda, the Late Show will present their own satires of such videos. Often that consists of a stock clip of bin Laden speaking into a microphone, with the audio being overdubbed. The new dialogue will range from bin Laden partaking in distinctly American pastimes (such as giving personal football predictions) to providing Al-Qaeda members with mundane advice (such as staying home during periods of extreme weather).

A common conclusion to the bin Laden parodies depicts him putting down his microphone, only to pick it back up and declare in a blasé manner: "Oh, and death to America."

"Pat and Kenny Read Oprah Transcripts"
The segment starts with a taped opening theme song, in which stagehands Pat Farmer and Kenny Sheehan perform a brief re-enactment of Winfrey's opening sequence ("Run on with Oprah"). Then Farmer and Sheehan read from an actual transcript of an episode of The Oprah Winfrey Show, usually involving a female celebrity guest, with Farmer taking the part of Winfrey and Sheehan the guest. Each read their lines in a distinctly monotone fashion, in humorous contrast to the enthusiastic nature of the original interview (which often includes Winfrey utterances such as "Woo hoo!" and "You go, girl!" to Letterman's amusement). During the reading, Sheehan sports a cigarette consisting mostly of ash which rarely breaks off. On some occasions the absurd nature of the bit will cause the two to break character (more often just Sheehan). At the end of the routine, Kalter gives an address for where to write to obtain a transcript of Pat and Kenny Read Oprah Transcripts. He finishes with a plug for "PK -- The Pat & Kenny Magazine" which is shown onscreen, and styled after Oprah's O, The Oprah Magazine.

Pat Farmer's "Surprise, You're on TV!"
Presented as a supposed clip from Farmer's own reality prank show, Farmer is seen standing next to an unsuspecting male victim in an ordinary setting, such as an elevator. Farmer is then shown to be holding a baseball bat, which he uses to strike the man in the pelvic area. As the man doubles over in pain, Farmer will address him and point to the camera, saying "Surprise, you're on TV!" Ostensibly this is a blunt satire of reality shows which utilize lowbrow physical humor, such as Jackass, as well as slapstick shows such as America's Funniest Home Videos.

"...Quiz" (such as the "Auto Show Quiz", "Boat Show Quiz", and "Toy Show Quiz")
Letterman presents video clips of people at a current event, on which is superimposed a multiple choice question, with the last choice being the punchline. For example the circus is in town. A slide shows a couple of clowns performing with a mode of transportation not quite visible with the question being "These brave and daring clowns are performing on A) An Unicycle, B) A small Car, or C) A small bear that devoured Regis Philbin.

"Rejected FDA Products"
A desk segment where Letterman displays samples of bad food concepts, such as "NyQuil Dessert Topping", and eats some of them. Likely inspired by the Topps card series Wacky Packages, which utilizes a similar emphasis on food.

"Sorry, Tom"
Letterman will explain that while not a scheduled guest, actor Tom Hanks is waiting backstage to make a surprise appearance. Hanks is then shown in the green room, smiling and waving to the delight of the audience. Letterman then informs Hanks that the show does not have enough time for him, causing Hanks to yell at an individual off-screen (ostensibly including obscenities). In reality, the footage of Hanks is a recycled clip from his visit on a much older episode, recorded specifically for later use in this bit. A notable use of this bit occurred during an interview with Hanks' own actor son, Colin. (Hanks also does many other comedy bits for the show whenever he's a guest, from making a glass-breaking noise, to a memorable "Audience Q & A" where he posed as a seat-filler for a member of the audience and was told "Wanna get outta my seat now, Fathead" by the angry woman.)

Susan Hum
As Letterman presents a comedy bit or converses with Shaffer, costume designer Hum will approach his desk carrying a food or drink item. Only after some time will Letterman acknowledge Hum, who will then inform him of the item she has with her. She then stands silently as Letterman attempts to proceed with the show. After noticing that she is still there, he will politely inform her that he is not interested in the item, provoking Hum to angrily insult Letterman (and sometimes throw the item to the floor) and walk off stage.

Ticket Scalper
Letterman will be setting up a bit when a man wearing a ski cap and jacket walks onto the set behind Letterman and nervously and quietly gets Letterman's attention and offers to sell him scalped tickets to a high-profile sporting event or concert which has already taken place. Letterman points out that the man is obviously holding tickets to the past year's Super Bowl (which is when the bits began), and that the current event for which he's trying to sell tickets has already taken place. The man will then quickly change his story, announcing another event which grabs Letterman's attention. Letterman pulls out his wallet and approaches the man, when the nervous broker thinks he hears the police and both he and Letterman quickly scatter. Letterman then returns to his original bit.

Weekend Late Show
On Friday shows, Letterman sometimes threw to a promotion for a purported Saturday edition of the Late Show. The hosts, identified only as Bruce and Linda, discussed "upcoming" features, which might include interviews with B-list celebrities and cooking segments. The segment served as a parody of the weekend editions of network morning news shows (e.g. Weekend Today and CBS This Morning Saturday); these editions normally have different hosts and an even greater focus on human interest stories than their weekday counterparts.

Letterman often spent a great deal of time complaining about the Weekend Late Show, and especially about Bruce, whom he felt should "be in prison". The Weekend Late Show was ostensibly cancelled as of the episode of February 15, 2013, when Letterman walked into the midst of a Weekend Late Show promotion and fired Bruce and Linda. However, by March, Bruce and Linda were back on a recurring basis to promote their hosting of the very similar Showbiz Weekend, a show Letterman frequently calls "unwatchable" and "even worse" than the cancelled Weekend Late Show.

== Recurring comedy bits ==
A partial list of recurring comedy bits that appeared on the show on a sporadic basis, as well as other notable bits from the show's earlier past:

- Alan Kalter's "Are You __ Kidding Me?" segment, which questions the sanity behind major news stories (for example, after the Michael Jackson verdict, Kalter's response: "Are You __ Kidding Me?!!")
- Alan Kalter's "Oh No You Didn't!" in which Kalter mentions a recent news story (such as a 5-week working vacation George W. Bush had once announced) and then says "Oh No You Di-int!", which is immediately followed by a mention of a celebrity who has recently done something which Alan finds sexy, and a "Oh, yes you did."
- Alex Trebek Came Back Too Soon. Starting with a premise such as that Alex Trebek is losing it, or just suffered a heart attack and came back to work too soon, an edited section of Jeopardy! is shown where the question does not match the answer and Alex says "correct", such as "The J in J.D. stands for this kind of doctor", the contestant says "What are jujubes?", and Alex says "correct." It began with Ken Jennings' long winning streak on the show being lampooned in the same manner after the rule of a Jeopardy player's winning streak being capped at 5 episodes was abolished.
- "Ape Or Artist?" A game in which an abstract painting is shown to Letterman and Shaffer, who then discuss whether it was an ape or an artist who painted it. After the first couple of instances, Letterman based his guesses more on psychology than the painting itself (saying things along the lines of "They want me to think it's an artist this time, so I'm going with ape"). After a while, the game became "Ape or Artist or Elephant?"
- "Ask ..." Letterman says that a celebrity, such as Hillary Clinton or Paris Hilton, will appear to answer questions the audience has submitted in advance. However, it is always Gerard Mulligan. There is usually one question about the celebrity being egotistical, which Mulligan does not initially answer, and then says to Letterman, "Oh, sorry. I thought that one was for you."
- "Bruce Willis's Mystery Word." Bruce Willis says a random word from a pre-recorded video.
- "Can A ... Hail A Cab?" Usually someone in an animal (Can a Guy in a Turkey Suit...") or superhero ("Can Spider-Man...") suit stands on Broadway and hails a cab, seeing if a taxi driver will stop and give the person a ride. It also has been tried by a person wearing a surgical mask portraying a traveler with drug resistant tuberculosis.
- ... Cards. Before Valentine's Day or Mother's Day, Letterman displays a series of mock greeting cards, with messages such as "I'm sorry I called you a dirty whore on Maury."
- CBS News Special Report. The news bulletin slide appears, but there is no bulletin.
- Chris and Gerry. Letterman introduces former writers for the show, Chris Elliot and Gerry Mulligan, who are there to promote their latest television program, which end up being parodies of existing shows (e.g., "Skink the Bounty Hunter"). Often they explain that the development of their new shows are due to the failure of their previous efforts. After the interview, a short clip of the contrived show is played. The interview segments usually involve the two wearing the outlandish costumes they don in the clip. Another recent version consists of clips from John Adams on HBO, where Elliot plays President Adams, and Mulligan plays a portrait artist or some other part. In one of them, Adams and companion did a Mac vs. PC (Get a Mac) commercial.

Elliot and Mulligan also appeared in "Late Show Tips for Green Living with Chris and Gerry." In addition to the recorded spots, showing the unexpected effects of carpooling or turning out the lights, they were together on stage in a sketch in which Mulligan implied that Elliot would taste organic and conventional produce, but instead tasted organically fertilized and chemically treated soil.

- Coach's Corner. Debuting in 2008 to 2011, the sketch features Art Kelly, a receptionist at the Letterman studio, who imitates former San Francisco 49ers coach Mike Singletary. When asked by Letterman about football-related topics, Kelly as Singletary would sometimes give a delayed or an answer not relating to the question and also talking in football jargon which makes no sense. Sometimes he is repeating responses from someone off-screen. He always has called Letterman by the name of "Jim". Kelly is usually dressed in 49ers clothing with a red shirt and hat and glasses like the real Mike Singletary. He sometimes would appear with a headset on. When asked about his schedule he either has no idea who his team is playing, or who he is coaching as once he referenced coaching in Tampa during a supposed week off, or playing against defunct teams such as the Birmingham Stallions of the then United States Football League which Letterman reminds him that it has been defunct since 1987. The segment returned for one last time on November 4, 2011, when Singletary was with the Minnesota Vikings. Once the segment had the participation of Billy Crystal who was a guest on the show in 2009.
- Cool or Not Cool. Debuting in June 2008, this is a sketch designed to juxtapose presidential candidate Barack Obama with President George W. Bush. First, a clip of Obama engaging in an activity is shown, followed by an on-screen graphic reading "COOL" and the sound of a bell. That is immediately followed by a clip of Bush engaging unsuccessfully in a similar activity, and then a graphic reading "NOT COOL" with the sound of a buzzer.
- Crystal Clear Party Ice - In 2000, Kalter presented a running gag in which he promoted this fake sponsor of the show. The lengthy pitch was recited daily with little variation: "Campaign 2000 has been brought to you by Crystal Clear Party Ice. It's not a party without Party Ice, and it's not Crystal Clear Party Ice unless it's crystal clear, the way party ice is supposed to be! Have you been to a party where the ice was cloudy? How did that make you feel? (Letterman would respond, 'Like a loser.') Like a loooooooseeer! Crystal Clear Party Ice is really, REALLY clear! AAAAND, it comes in a bag! Crystal Clear Party Ice is available in 'Crystal Clear,' 'Semi-Clear,' and the all new 'Opaque.' Visit our website at: 'www.CrystalClearPartyIce.com,' and find out how you can win a million dollars' worth of Crystal Clear Party Ice for your next party, wedding or get together! Aaaaah, Party Ice!" He would sometimes add, "The weekend is right around the corner, so why not pick up a 'couple' of bags of Crystal Clear Party Ice? You'll be glad you did!" As the bit wore on, Letterman would respond to Kalter's pitch, such as pointing out that the weekend was still several days away.
- "Get To Know Delaware." In recognition of Joe Biden being selected as the Democratic vice presidential nominee, this series promoted tourist attractions such as Independence Hall and the Franklin Institute in Philadelphia, which borders Delaware, or in another installment, the announcer described the Battle of New Castle and then admitted that he made it up because he knows nothing about Delaware.
- Hose cam. On a hot day, a hose shoots water on pedestrians near the Ed Sullivan Theater. Inside, Letterman uses a toggle switch to turn the water on and off, and a microphone (similar to one used with a taxicab radio) to make comments to the people on the street.
- "Immigration Success Stories." A segment running since immigration reform was brought to the United States Congress in 2006. The segment profiles various well-known immigrants, before switching to archival footage of actor and Governor of California Arnold Schwarzenegger shown doing suggestive things with females.
- Jeter's place. Derek Jeter's mansion, which, according to the staff, is horrendous, is shown repetitively when Letterman calls for a picture to be seen. The staff says the viewers can call or email them if they want to get rid of Jeter's mansion, but the audience loves it (the repetition and the nature of the "error").
- Joe Grossman: Sometimes based on the premise that it is difficult to write jokes about President Barack Obama, Late Show writer Joe Grossman appears on stage to read his proposed material (usually substituting Obama's name for references to George Bush or Al Gore) from a note pad.
- Joe McCain Call. After the incident when Joe McCain ended a 911 call with an expletive, Letterman receives a call from McCain, usually saying something irrelevant followed by "Bleep you." The setup by Barbara Gaines is essentially the same as for a Lt. Len Easton call. While a guest, Regis Philbin was told to answer a call on Letterman's cell phone, which was from "McCain." Similar calls have also been received from "Christian Bale" after his tirade.
- "Johnny Twain Tonight." Johnny Dark dressed as Mark Twain sits in a rocking chair and recites Rodney Dangerfield jokes. Dark has also appeared in a similar segment called "Johnny Lincoln Tonight", with the only modification being Dark dressed as Abraham Lincoln.
- Lance Armstrong. An overweight man pretending to be a prominent athlete of the day, usually Lance Armstrong, but also (among other examples) a recently victorious NASCAR driver, golfer, or jockey, but always dressed in Armstrong's yellow Discovery Team jersey. He is introduced, "Ladies and gentleman, name of athlete" while riding a bicycle through the aisles of the theatre and exiting through a door in the back. This segment is always accompanied by the CBS Orchestra playing the Ike and Tina Turner version of "Proud Mary". On the August 21, 2006 show, the segment was mixed up even further, with an introduction of golfer Tiger Woods, and a caption of cyclist Floyd Landis. (This sketch had its roots in a 1994 sketch, when Johnny Carson was introduced to the crowd and Calvert DeForest came out instead. After DeForest left, Letterman summoned to "Johnny" that he had the wrong Top Ten List, and the real Johnny Carson came out, with the list in his hand.)
- "Let's Talk About the Candidates." A faux audience participation bit where Letterman initially chats with actual audience members about the 2008 presidential campaign. After Letterman comments on a recent candidate's departure from the race, a plant in the audience, always played by the same show staffer, reacts with disbelief and outrage. He then storms out of the theater and pummels pages along the way. In one segment, the plant reacts in this manner to the news that John Edwards was ending his campaign. Afterwards, the first audience member, himself a staffer, reacts in the same violent manner upon learning that Rudy Giuliani was also dropping out and beats the same pages as he leaves. Letterman often closes the segment by lamenting that they no longer have any time due to the outbursts. The series of sketches culminated with "Let's Talk About the Election" on November 5, 2008, where the mock assault occurred after the plant complained that he was duped by a flier that Democrats vote on Wednesday.
  - For the 2012 United States presidential election, "Get to know the candidates" in which faux facts about the Republican Party presidential candidates, 2012 are shown; (and, the even more obscure "Get to know the guy behind the Get to know the Candidates" in which a video editor declares personal despair after giving "10 hours a day" to the effort of watching the Republican candidate tapes.)
- Live Crash Footage. Letterman will point to his ear, as if taking instructions from the director, and announce that he is being told that they have "live" footage of various celebrities and public figures driving to a particular destination, and ultimately crashing (actually stock news footage of actual, spectacular crashes). Subjects included Patrick J. Kennedy, Billy Joel, Nicole Richie, and Pittsburgh Steelers quarterback Ben Roethlisberger (on a motorcycle). Letterman will then assure the audiences that he is being told that the celebrity is "all right."
- Lt. Len Easton. Barbara Gaines asks Letterman to pick up his phone, on which he gets a radio call from a fictitious Lt. Len Easton (voiced by Jeff Altman) of the California Highway Patrol driving on a California freeway on police business, requesting backup. The majority of these calls begin by sounding seemingly normal but will end with an absurd, humorous statement or request. In recent sketches, Letterman says that he is not the only one who is getting Easton's calls, and then shows a clip from a popular call-in show showing its host, such as Larry King, Suze Orman, or Mike and the Mad Dog, receiving a call with the audio of Easton being overdubbed, and occasionally a caption such as "Len from California" superimposed.
- Lyle the Intern. Lyle Warren Bortz Jr., a supposed Late Show intern (played by actor Jimmi Simpson) will appear out of nowhere, sitting on a guest chair, to interrupt a befuddled Letterman for a casual chat. He is portrayed as a smooth, laid-back slacker-type who often uses hipster slang and fancies himself a ladies man. In his first appearance, he encouraged Letterman to act as his "wingman" at a bar after the show. On his February 17, 2009 appearance, several stations on the eastern time zone shut off their analog signals at 11:59pm in accordance with the original Digital Television transition date, including WDEF-TV in Chattanooga, Tennessee and WWNY in Watertown, New York. As a result of that, the last words that ever aired on these stations were Lyle saying "I know where you live, be-yoooooooootch!" before the signal cuts out for good.
- Mac vs. PC. A parody of Apple's Get a Mac series of commercials, with former writers Chris Elliott and Gerard Mulligan portraying the roles of Mac and PC, respectively. The bits often end with Mulligan inflicting bodily harm on Elliott.
- The Man on Fire. A stuntman wildly runs across the stage back and forth while screaming with his clothes on fire before being extinguished backstage. A variation of this was performed in which the man was not on fire but acted as if he were.
- "Millionaire or Kenny?" A man is shown while Letterman and Shaffer debate whether the man is a millionaire or a man named Kenny.
- News Bulletin. Suddenly, an old ABC Radio News theme is played, Dave confusedly looks through his papers, and then tells Barbara Gaines that he thought he had to read a bulletin.
- Portrait of Biff Henderson. Various artists create a portrait, using ketchup, Legos, post-it notes, and other "art media."
- "Psychic Sandwich." In the Hello Deli, Deborah Lynn - a self-described "intuitive" - attempts to guess the sandwich being made by Jee, which are all named after various Late Show staffers. Lynn, who is blindfolded, had never successfully named a sandwich. In 2005, a variation of the game involving chocolates was played, in which Lynn picked up a piece at random before guessing its content. On her second try, Lynn successfully guessed "nougat." On another episode later that year, a variation was played involving Jee's Slurpee-like drinks, and Lynn correctly guessed "cherry" on her first try. In these segments, Lynn is often asked by Letterman to explain the difference between a psychic and intuitive. On a recent episode, Lynn was asked to guess the price of a gallon of gas that Rupert provided her in a gasoline can. She guessed $4.40, however the gas was actually $4.30. Letterman made note of the fact that Lynn admitted she had heard something on the news that morning about gas prices in New York by saying she had integrity in disclosing that information up front.
- Putting Away the Late Show Bear. A man in a bear suit is pushed and locked into a closet. The last time this sketch was played, a young intern lost control of the bear and it went on a rampage before finally calling for a taxi.
- Quarterback Challenge. Letterman challenges an NFL quarterback on the show to throw as many footballs at some target, such as into the open back window of a moving cab, as possible. A version of the challenge gave rise to the annual throwing of the football at the ornament at the top of the Christmas tree, when Vinny Testaverde could not hit the target, but Jay Thomas did. Later the ornament has been replaced by a meatball.
- "Telemundo Highlight of the Night." Usually it is a short clip from a Telemundo show, such as Laura en América, showing something similar to a Jerry Springer Show fight, but, of course, in Spanish. A similar concept is "Spanish Television is Better."
- This Day In The Clinton Marriage: While Secretary of State Hillary Clinton is out of the country on a diplomatic mission, this clip purportedly shows what Bill Clinton is doing, implying partying and possibly marital infidelity.
- "Trump or Monkey?" Played in the Hello Deli, the game involves a contestant being presented by Jee with two photos of monkeys, and a photo of celebrity businessman Donald Trump. Only the tops of the heads are visible, with the rest covered by a card. The contestant then attempts to guess which of the photos is Trump's. Around the release of the film Star Wars: Episode III – Revenge of the Sith in 2005, a variation of the game called "Trump or Wookiee?" was played.
- "What the Hell is it?" In the style of "Is this Anything" and "Will it Float", this game had Letterman guess the name of a mystery object. The game was played only a handful of times. A running gag was that when Alan Kalter would announce the object's name to the audience, Letterman would unintentionally hear it clearly, thus leading to greater and greater amounts of soundproofing each time the game was played.
- "What's the Deal with Old Guys and Giant Glasses?" Letterman simply presents a series of photographs of celebrity men (and occasionally, women). The photos are often dated with the subjects sporting large, old-fashioned style glasses.
- "Who Asked for It?" A staple of late-night television, audience members approach a microphone and ask a question, resulting in a prearranged sketch in response (like a person asking if Regis Philbin will run into the theater, and a staffer does instead).
- "Women in Prison." Letterman offers to conduct a remote interview of Martha Stewart or Paris Hilton in jail, but the show then runs stock footage of women in prison having a food fight or rioting.
- Writers' Guild Strike. Another routine (usually a fake promotional announcement) is interrupted by the show's head writer Bill Scheft, who announces that the Writers Guild is currently in negotiations for a new contract and at this time we have chosen not to reveal the punchline to this hilarious joke until the big media companies show they are ready to play fair with the writers (and pay them more). The routine continued after Worldwide Pants settled with the Writers Guild of America and the Late Show returned, to show solidarity with the other writers who still were on strike. Scheft has interrupted other routines, such as one dealing with Hillary Clinton's pantsuit, to protest having to write those jokes after she should have left the race.
- Biff Henderson's "Fun with a Bullhorn"
- Biff Henderson's "Fun with a Stopwatch"
- Biff Henderson's "Wanna Hang Out?"
- "Celebrity X-ray Challenge"
- "Dave's Record Collection"
- Dick Assman, who made several appearances in 1995
- "Dr. Phil's Words of Wisdom." Out-of-context clips from the Dr. Phil Show; the bit was similar to the "Great Moments in Presidential Speeches" sketch.
- "Dumb Ads"
- "George W. Bush Joke That's Not Really a Joke"
- Harold Larkin's "Sidewalk Idol"
- "Late Show Checklist"
- "Late Show Pay Phone Trifecta"
- "Late Show Unfair Edit", later "Late Show Fun with Editing", later "Late Show Editing Fun"
- "May We See Your Photos Please?"/"May We See Your Digital Photos Please?"
- Pat Farmer's "Gaffe-Busters"
- Pat Farmer's "Long Story Short"
- Pat Farmer's "Anything Can Be a Musical Instrument"
- Paul Shaffer's James Brown cape routine (with various celebrities, including James Brown himself on one occasion, putting a cape on Shaffer)
- "Pedestrian Theme Songs" - A sketch in which various clips of pedestrians walking around New York City were accompanied by a humorous short song clip performed by The CBS Orchestra
- "Week in Review" (used to be a regular Friday feature, using a variation of the "Laugh-In Looks at the News" theme)
- "Who Said It?"
- "Dave interviews coach Mike Singletary (from the San Francisco 49ers)"
