= The Temple News =

Student-run weekly newspaper at Temple University

- The paper's March 17, 2009 front page.
- Type: Bi-weekly student newspaper
- Format: Tabloid
- Owner: Temple University
- Publisher: Evergreen Printing & Publishing Company
- Editor-in-chief: Sienna Conaghan
- Founded: September 19, 1921 as Temple University Weekly
- Headquarters: Suite 243, 1755 N. 13th St. Philadelphia, Pennsylvania 19122
- Circulation: 1,000 Biweekly
- Website: temple-news.com

The Temple News (TTN) is the editorially independent bi-weekly newspaper of Temple University. It prints 2,000 copies to be distributed primarily on Temple's Main Campus every other Tuesday. A staff of 36, supported by more than 150 writers, is responsible for designing, reporting and editing the bi-weekly paper. Increasingly, TTN is supplementing its bi-weekly print product with breaking news and online-only content on its web site.

In 2023, the paper's efforts garnered nine Keystone Press Awards. The previous year, the paper's staff won 13 Keystones. In November 2008, the paper's web site, temple-news.com, was honored with the 2008 National Online Pacemaker Award, and has also won the print counterpart, a National Pacemaker Award, both awarded by the Associated Collegiate Press.

== History ==
Temple University Weekly first appeared on Monday, Sept. 19, 1921. It was led by an alumni editor and fully supported by the university, though student writers were responsible for coverage.

Beginning in the 1930s and continuing into the 1950s, with exceptions during World War II, the now-labeled Temple University News printed Mondays, Wednesdays and Fridays. During the 1960s and 1970s, the paper went daily, before dropping to four days per week in the 1980s. In the early 1990s, TTN was the fourth largest daily newspaper in Philadelphia. In the late 1990s, citing declining ad revenue and staff size, the paper returned to its weekly origins. With the exception of a single semester in 2005, TTN went bi-weekly in 2019, and monthly in 2023 before returning to bi-weekly prints in 2024. TTN also publishes daily online content.

Contrary to industry trends, The Temple News had a renaissance in staff numbers and interest in its content in the twenty-first century. The publication did not create its website until 1998, and it did not have its own domain name until 2003.

TTN has made significant progress in the sphere of internet journalism. It has been a perennial nominee for the Associated Collegiate Press's Online Pacemaker[4] award, which it won in 2008. At the moment, the paper is powered by WordPress.

In January 2009,[5] a newly designed website premiered, offering content available exclusively online and a rising multimedia presence, including photo galleries, audio, and video.

In the summer of 2012, the site was revamped in its current configuration. The Temple News provides complimentary printed copies to all students, professors, and staff. Its present format is designed to make it more interesting for its target audience. The site features breaking news, editorials, podcast episodes, data visuals, multimedia, and a variety of other topics.

== Production ==
In a given Temple News production week, articles and graphics are typically assigned during Friday budget meetings for the following week's Tuesday printing or online cycle. Editorial content is typically deadlined on Thursday, to be fact-checked and corrected by section editors and copy editors.

While both the news and sports sections have moved away from including breaking news in its print product — opting for an online venue — these sections typically allow for deadlines on Monday production nights.

== Awards ==
The Temple News has been honored with numerous awards in the past few years, beginning with the Keystone Press Awards in February 2006. TTN editors, reporters and photographers have won Keystone Press Awards in every year since. In 2009, staff members won awards for ongoing news coverage, public service/enterprise package, news photos, sports photos, photo story and web site.

The Temple News Online is a finalist in the 2009 Online Pacemaker competition by the Associated Collegiate Press. The results will be announced in October 2009 at the ACP/CMA National College Media Convention in Austin.

Most recently, TTN Online earned an EPpy Award for the Best College Newspaper Web Site in the country. The award is given by Editor & Publisher and Mediaweek magazines. In February 2014, The Temple News won 17 Keystone Press Awards.

== Notable alumni ==
- Bill Conlin, 1960 (TTN Editor-in-Chief), Philadelphia Daily News sports columnist
- Phil Jasner, 1964-1966 (TTN sports writer), Philadelphia Daily News 76ers beat writer
- Tom Ferrick, 1968* (TTN Editor-in-Chief), retired Philadelphia Inquirer columnist; 1979 Pulitzer Prize for Breaking News *Did not graduate
- Chuck Darrow, 1977 (TTN Editor-in-Chief), Philadelphia Daily News casino columnist
- Nancy E. Krulik, 1983 (TTN news editor), three time New York Times bestseller and creator of the Katie Kazoo and How I Survived Middle School book series
- Clarence Williams, 1987 (TTN photographer), Los Angeles Times photographer; 1998 Pulitzer Prize for Feature Photography
- John Finger, 1994 (TTN sports editor), Comcast Sports Net, CSNPhilly.com
- Damian J. Holbrook, 1994 (TTN entertainment editor), TV Guide senior writer
- E. Martin Hulse, 1995 (TTN Editor-in-Chief), Lancaster New Era features editor; York Daily Record food editor/features designer; Delaware State News reporter/copy editor/designer
- Paul Zeise, 1997 (TTN Opinion editor), Pittsburgh Post-Gazette sports writer
- Kevin Negandhi, 1997 (TTN Sports editor), ESPN contributing anchor
- John DiCarlo, 1998 (TTN Sports), OwlScoop.com
- Kristen Graham, 2000 (TTN staff writer), Philadelphia Inquirer education reporter; 2012 Pulitzer Prize for Public Service
- Tracy Davidson, 2006 (TTN staff writer), WCAU co-anchor
- Brian James Kirk, 2008 (TTN columnist), Technically Media co-founder
- Kurtis Lee, 2009 (TTN staff writer), Denver Post reporter; 2013 Pulitzer Prize for Breaking News
- Evan Easterling, 2019 (TTN Sports Editor), New York Times sports editor
- Gillian McGoldrick, 2019 (TTN Editor-in-Chief), Philadelphia Inquirer Harrisburg reporter
- Isabella DiAmore, 2022 (TTN Sports Editor), The Philadelphia Inquirer
- Lawrence Ukenye, 2023 (TTN Editor-in-Chief), POLITICO reporter
- Jevon Edmonds, 2023 (Assistant Sports Editor), Syracuse.com
- Fallon Roth, 2024 (TTN Editor-in-Chief), The Philadelphia Inquirer
- Sam O'Neil, 2025 (TTN Editor-in-Chief), The Fort Worth Star Telegram
- Colin Schofield, 2026 (TTN Sports Editor), The Goshen News
