= Press box =

Building designed to house media personnel inside sporting arenas

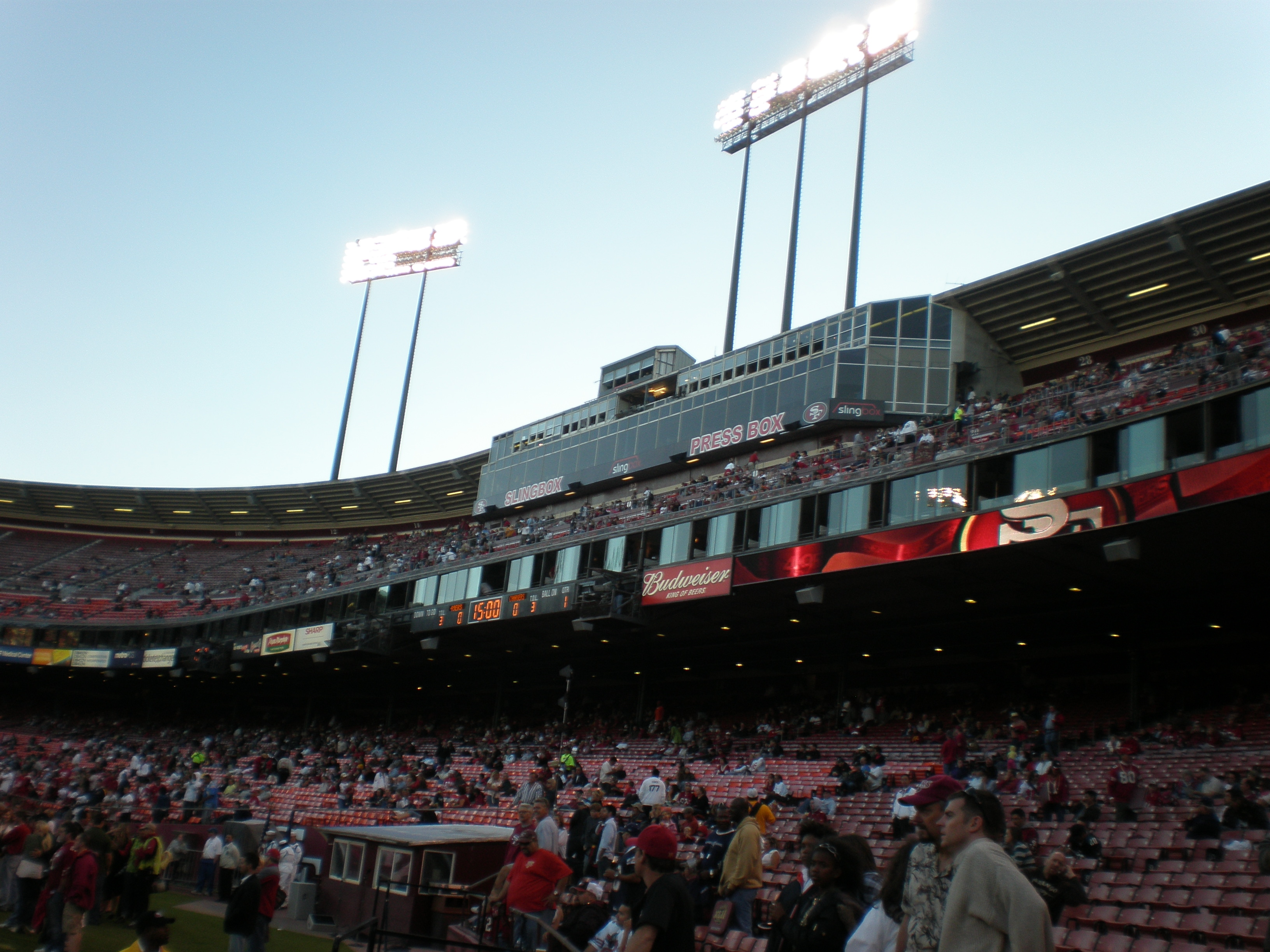
Press box at Candlestick Park, San Francisco.

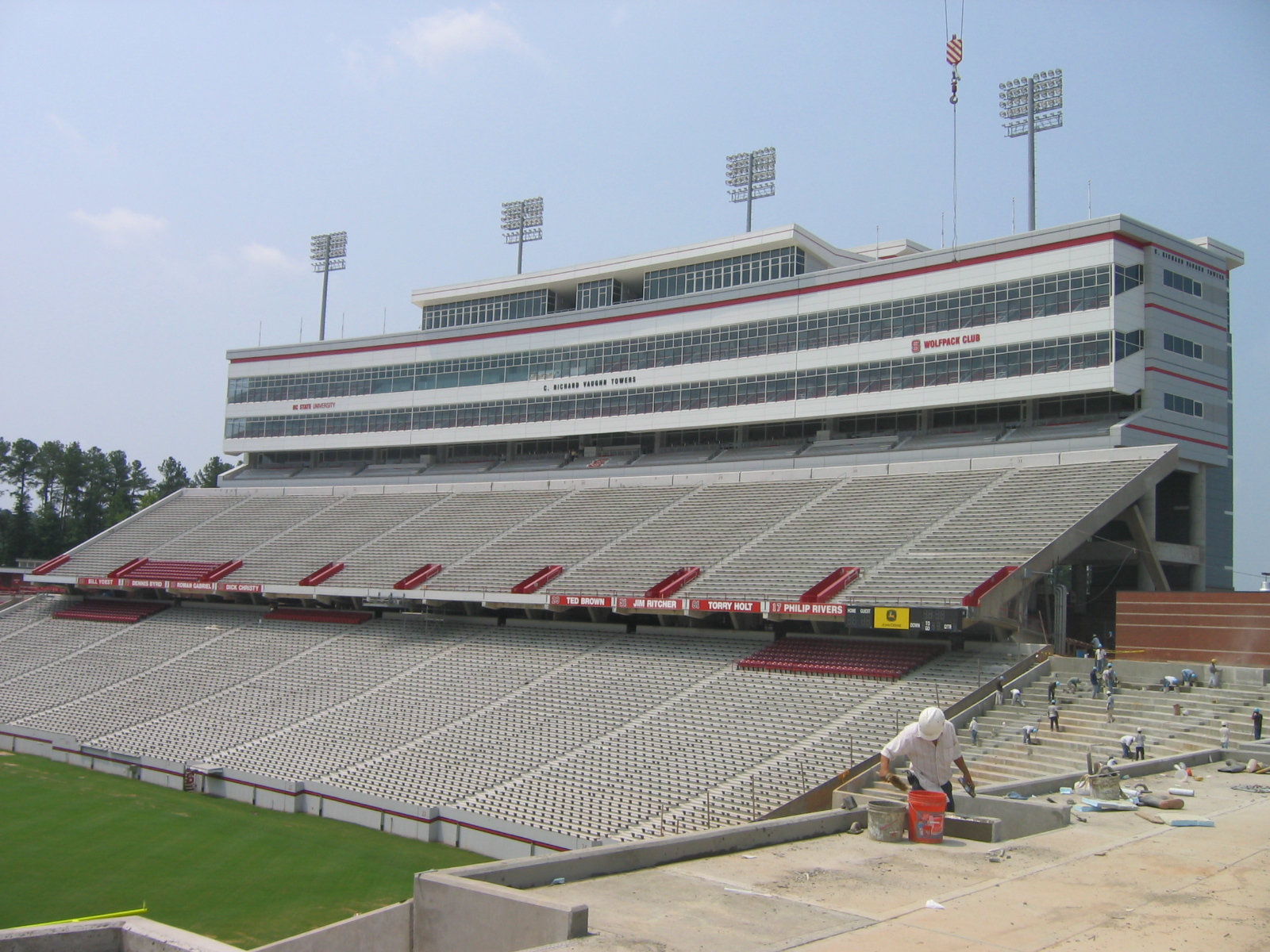
The massive press box at Carter–Finley Stadium at NC State.

The press box is a special section of a sports venue that is set up for the media to report about a given event. It is typically located in the section of the stadium holding the luxury box and can be either enclosed or open to the elements. In general, newspaper writers sit in this box and write about the on-field event as it unfolds. Television and radio announcers broadcast from the press box as well. Finally, in gridiron football, some coaches (especially offensive coordinators) prefer to work from the press box instead of from the sideline in order to have an "all 22" view of both the offensive and defensive players, along with coaching personnel ordered by physicians due to medical conditions, or injuries which require rehabilitation and prevent them from being on the sidelines due to risk of further injury. For college and professional basketball, a "press row" along the sideline across the way from the scorer's table is set up instead for broadcasters and statisticians, while most writers work from a traditional press box position.

The press box is considered to be a working area, and writers, broadcasters, and other visitors to press boxes are constantly reminded of this fact at sporting events. Cheering is strictly forbidden in press boxes, and anyone violating rules against showing favoritism for either team is subject to ejection from the press box by security personnel. The rule against cheering is generally enforced only in the writers' area of the press box, and not against coaches and (in many cases) broadcasters who are known to be employed by one of the teams involved.

== See also ==
- Baseball Writers' Association of America
- National Collegiate Baseball Writers Association
- Pro Basketball Writers Association
- United States Basketball Writers Association (college)
- Football Writers Association of America (college)
- Pro Football Writers Association
- Professional Hockey Writers Association
- National Sportscasters and Sportswriters Association
