= TV Land Confidential =

US documentaryTV series

- Genre: Documentary
- Created by: David P. Levin
- Starring: Alan Kalter

Original release
- Network: TV Land
- Release: September 14, 2005 – August 8, 2007

TV Land Confidential was a documentary show which took a look at favorite film and television shows discussing the near-miss casting decisions, pilots with different cast members, and the ongoing real-life drama behind the scenes. The show was created and produced by David P. Levin and hosted by Alan Kalter. It ran on TV Land from 2005 to 2007.

== Production ==
TV Land Confidential went behind the scenes to talk to the stars of some of the most iconic and successful shows in American film and television history. Each episode, the producers spoke to actors, producers, and network executives to uncover stories ranging from love on the set and health problems which altered the direction of a show to unaired pilots and near-miss casting decisions. It also discussed show pilots which had different cast members, and the ongoing real-life drama behind the scenes.

== Guest stars ==
Stars who appeared on the show included:

- Debbie Allen
- John Amos
- Bea Arthur
- Edward Asner
- Adrienne Barbeau
- Richard Belzer
- Tom Bosley
- Peter Boyle
- Todd Bridges
- Morgan Brittany
- Kirk Cameron
- Diana Canova
- Diahann Carroll
- David Cassidy
- Joan Collins
- Nikki Cox
- Yvonne Craig
- Bryan Cranston
- Tony Danza
- Dana Delaney
- William Devane
- Micky Dolenz
- Fran Drescher
- Patrick Duffy
- Julia Duffy
- Josh Duhamel
- Barbara Eden
- David Faustino

- Dann Florek
- Max Gail
- Beverly Garland
- Gloria Gaynor
- Larry Gelbart
- Ron Glass
- Louis Gossett Jr.
- Don Grady
- Robert Guillaume
- Jasmine Guy
- Larry Hagman
- Kadeem Hardison
- Pat Harrington, Jr.
- Jenilee Harrison
- Robert Hegyes
- Marilu Henner
- Dwayne Hickman
- Lawrence Hilton-Jacobs
- Judd Hirsch
- Davy Jones (musician)
- Cheryl Ladd
- John Landis
- Vicki Lawrence
- Chloris Leachman
- Hal Linden
- Mark Linn-Baker
- Barry Livingston
- Christopher Lloyd

- Gavin MacLeod
- Rue McClanahan
- Lee Meriwether
- Noel Neill
- Donny Osmond
- Bronson Pinchot
- Tom Poston
- Linda Purl
- John Ratzenberger
- Tanya Roberts
- Wayne Rogers
- John Schneider (screen actor)
- Sherwood Schwartz
- Larry Storch
- Alan Thicke
- Marlo Thomas
- Lea Thompson
- Charlene Tilton
- Frankie Valli
- Dick Van Patten
- Jon Voight
- Jimmie Walker
- Jaleel White
- Betty White
- Anson Williams
- Billy Dee Williams
- Tom Wopat
- Alan Young
