= Pro Basketball Writers Association =

The Professional Basketball Writers Association (PBWA) is a professional nonprofit organization for sportswriters and editors who write about professional basketball—including the National Basketball Association (NBA)—for newspapers, magazines and websites.

== History ==
The idea of a professional organization like the PBWA began to be discussed in the early 1970s. One of the rationales was to improve working conditions. For NBA beat writers, the league did not have a specific policy regarding access to locker rooms, team practices, players, coaches, general managers, and other executives.

On January 18, 1972, interested sportswriters gathered formally for the first time, to begin organizing what was to become the Pro Basketball Writers Association of America (PBWAA). The meeting occurred at the Century Plaza Hotel, in Los Angeles, California, during the NBA All-Star Game weekend. The PBWAA organized formally one year later, on January 23, 1973, at a meeting in the O'Hare Hyatt Regency Hotel, in Chicago, Illinois.

== Presidents ==
See footnote

- 1972–1974 – Joe Gilmartin, Phoenix Gazette
- 1974–1976 – Don Fair, Seattle Post Intelligencer
- 1976–1977 – George Cunningham, The Atlanta Journal-Constitution
- 1977–1980 – Steve Hersey, The Washington Star
- 1980–1982 – George White, Houston Chronicle
- 1982–1983 – Bob Ryan, The Boston Globe
- 1983–1985 – Fran Blinebury, Houston Chronicle
- 1985–1987 – Phil Jasner, Philadelphia Daily News
- 1987–1988 – Don Greenberg, Orange County Register
- 1988–1990 – Jan Hubbard, The Dallas Morning News
- 1990–1992 – Shaun Powell, Miami Herald
- 1992–1994 – Fred Kerber, New York Post
- 1994–1996 – Mike Kahn, The News-Tribune
- 1996–1997 – Mike Monroe, The Denver Post
- 1997–1999 – Dave D'Alessandro, The Star-Ledger
- 1999–2005 – Sam Smith, Chicago Tribune
- 2005–2007 – Steve Aschburner, Star Tribune
- 2007-2009 – Rick Bonnell, The Charlotte Observer
- 2009-2013 – Doug Smith, Toronto Star
- 2013-2014 – Mary Schmitt Boyer, Cleveland Plain Dealer
- 2014-2023 – Josh Robbins, Orlando Sentinel

== Awards Held by PBWA ==
- Best Writing Contest PBWA Blumenthal Memorial Writing Contest, which honors the best work by members of the Professional Basketball Writers. Chris Ballard, Kevin Ding, Jason Quick and Marc J. Spears were named first-place winners in 2015.
- Brian McIntyre Award this Media Relations Award which is presented each season to an NBA media relations staff that best exemplifies the standards of professionalism and excellence worthy of acclaim. The public relations staff of the Golden State Warriors lead with seven wins.
- J. Walter Kennedy Citizenship Award is an annual National Basketball Association (NBA) award given since 1975 to a player, coach, or staff member who shows "outstanding service and dedication to the community." Notable winners of the award include Stephen Curry (2022–2023), LeBron James (2016–2017), Steve Nash (2006–2007), Reggie Miller (2003–2004), Magic Johnson (1991–1992), and Isiah Thomas (1986–1987).
- Magic Johnson Award is an annual award for an NBA player who recognizes excellence on the court and cooperation and dignity with the media and public. The award, which was created in 2001, has been given to some of the league's most prominent players over the years, including Stephen Curry (2015–2016 & 2023–2024), Pau Gasol (2014–2015), Dirk Nowitzki (2013–2014), Kevin Durant (2010–2011), and Ray Allen (2000–2001).
- Rudy Tomjanovich Award presented annually to recognizes a coach for his cooperation with the media and fans, as well as his excellence on the court. Steve Kerr of the Golden State Warriors has won the award the most with three wins.
- Tamika Catchings Award honors the WNBA player who best combines excellence on the court with cooperation and dignity in dealing with the media and public.

== See also ==
- United States Basketball Writers Association (college)
- Baseball Writers' Association of America (BBWAA)
- National Collegiate Baseball Writers Association
- Pro Football Writers Association
- Football Writers Association of America (college)
- Professional Hockey Writers Association
- National Sportscasters and Sportswriters Association
