= The $128,000 Question =

American game show

- Directed by: Dick Schneider; George Choderker
- Presented by: Mike Darow (1976–1977); Alex Trebek (1977–1978)
- Announcer: Alan Kalter (1976–1977); Sandy Hoyt (1977–1978)
- Countries of origin: United States, Canada
- No. of seasons: 2
- No. of episodes: 78

Production
- Executive producers: Steve Carlin; Jerry Appleton
- Producers: Willie Stein; Greg Harper; Candy Cazau
- Production locations: Ed Sullivan Theater; New York, New York (1976–77); Global Television; Toronto, Ontario (1977–1978)
- Running time: 30 minutes
- Production company: Cinelar Associates

Original release
- Network: Syndicated (weekly)
- Release: September 18, 1976 – September 1978

The $128,000 Question is an American game show which aired from 1976 to 1978 in weekly syndication. This revival of The $64,000 Question was produced by Cinelar Associates and distributed by Viacom Enterprises.

Steve Carlin, producer of the series, bought out the rights to the $64,000 Question IP after Entertainment Productions went under in 1959, years before retooling the show.

Originally, Viacom had intended to revive the series with the same title (and top payoff), but when it was announced that rival series Name That Tune would be adding a "$100,000 Mystery Tune" for the 1976–77 season, Viacom did not wish for their series to only have the second-biggest payoff and added an end-of-season $64,000 tournament to the format.

Further hindering the show was that a planned deal with CBS owned-and-operated stations to carry it in major markets had to be scrapped because of the network-imposed $25,000 winnings limit for game shows (which, at the time, was also extended to syndicated games airing on the O&Os). While the producers were able to get the Metromedia-owned stations to fill these gaps and the series did well enough to be renewed for a second season, The $128,000 Question proved not to be as popular as its predecessor and it came to an end in 1978.

== Hosts and announcers ==
Mike Darow hosted the first season with Alan Kalter as announcer, and the series was taped in New York City at CBS's Ed Sullivan Theater. The second season moved production to Don Mills, Toronto, Ontario, at Global Television Network's studios. Alex Trebek became host, with model Sylvie Garant as his assistant, and Sandy Hoyt became the announcer.

== Gameplay ==
As on The $64,000 Question, each contestant was quizzed in a category which was his or her own area of expertise. In the first season, contestants selected categories from a board with several options. Once the contestant chose a category, a cassette tape containing four questions was given to host Darow, who then fed it into an electric typewriter onstage. For each question, Darow read it as the typewriter printed it onto a sheet of paper. After the contestant gave a response, the typewriter printed the correct answer. The first question was worth $64 for a correct answer, and the next three subsequent answers doubled that amount, up to $512. The contestant was given a chance to stop after every question, as answering incorrectly at any point ended the run and he/she was awarded a consolation prize, the value of which varied depending on when the incorrect answer was given.

If a contestant continued on from $512, the next question was worth $1,000 and play moved across the stage to a podium positioned in front of a television monitor. Game play remained the same as before, with each question displayed on the screen. Once the contestant gave a response, the correct answer was displayed on the screen. If the contestant answered the $1,000 question correctly and elected to play on, a pair of multi-part questions were asked one at a time. Once again, and from this point forward, answering correctly doubled the contestant's money. If both multi-part questions were answered correctly, the contestant ended up with a total of $4,000.

If the contestant was still in the game after seven questions had been asked, he/she was placed in an isolation booth onstage. Darow was handed an envelope containing a question with four or more parts, and after the question was asked the contestant was given some time to think before being prompted to answer. Answering each part of the question correctly doubled his/her winnings to $8,000.

If the contestant kept going from here, he/she would be brought back on the next program to play for $16,000 with another, more difficult multi-part question. After that, the contestant could potentially face two more questions depending on his/her willingness to continue. The first was played for $32,000 and, if the contestant continued, he/she faced one last question. Answering it correctly won the contestant a total of $64,000 and enabled him/her to return at the end of the season for a chance to double that total to $128,000.

With the move to Toronto for the second season, the set and format were changed. A contestant's field of expertise was chosen prior to the show and revealed on air instead of chosen from the category board. Contestants now stood behind a podium with a numerical readout for the first five questions and the typewriter and television monitor stations were removed, with Trebek reading the questions from a booklet. Players entered the isolation booth following the $2,000 question and if they answered the second-to-last question correctly they received $24,000 cash and an automobile instead of an all-cash prize.

== Consolation prizes ==
If a contestant missed on any question up to the $4,000 question, he/she received $1 as a consolation prize. If the miss came on the $8,000 or $16,000 question, the contestant left with a new automobile. If a contestant answered the $16,000 question correctly but failed to answer either the $32,000 or $64,000 questions correctly, he/she was guaranteed to leave with no less than that amount in cash in season one, and with a car and $8,000 cash in season 2.

== Tournament play ==
Four contestants won $64,000 during the first season. The semifinals consisted of three rounds of questions for each contestant, and contestants were asked four questions in each round. If the contestant answered all four questions correctly, an additional question was asked. Each correct answer scored one point in round one, two points in round two and three points in round three. After three rounds of questions, the two contestants with the highest scores advanced to the finals, in which the finalists alternated answering questions. The first contestant to answer six questions correctly won $64,000. However, each contender would be given an equal number of questions. If both contestants were tied at six points each, the contestants continued answering questions until the tie was broken.

Season two featured two $64,000 winners. The playoff game consisted of four rounds of gameplay. In each of the first four rounds, each contestant was given four questions. Each correct answer scored one point in round one, two points in round two, four points in round three and eight points in round four. After the fourth round, both contestants took turns answering 16-point questions until one contestant achieved a total score of at least 128 points to win an additional $64,000.

== Home game ==
A home version of The $128,000 Question was released by Ideal Toy Company in 1977 and followed the first season format, complete with a "category tree". It was given to all contestants who appeared on the show during that first season.

== Theme music ==
The theme music was an updated version of the original composition by Norman Leyden and performed by Charles Randolph Grean, the show's musical director during its first season. Grean's group, The Charles Randolph Grean Sounde, recorded the theme and it was released as the B-side of Grean's 1976 single "Sentimentale" on Ranwood Records (R-1064). The track was a medley of the main theme, the cue heard when the printout tape was given to Darow, the "isolation booth" theme, a reprise of the main theme, the music heard during the announcement on how to apply to be a contestant, and a second reprise of the main theme ending in a grand crescendo.

The Welk Music Group, parent company of Ranwood, currently owns the master tape of Grean's recording of the $128,000 Question theme. WMG has not rereleased the track themselves on CD or licensed it to other labels to appear on compilation albums as of this writing.

The second season featured a live orchestra conducted by Guido Basso.

== Reruns ==
The entire series was rebroadcast on KDOC-TV in Anaheim, California from January 31 to June 7, 1983. Additionally, other local stations aired reruns of The $128,000 Question during the late 1970s and early 1980s.
