= The A-List (2007 TV series) =

- Genre: Comedy; Documentary
- Written by: Courtenay Singer; Barry Gribble; Mary Casey; Mike Kane; Emma Rigney
- Directed by: David P. Levin
- Music by: Joel Beckerman; Shawn K. Clement
- Country of origin: United States
- Original language: English
- No. of seasons: 1
- No. of episodes: 14

Production
- Editor: Shaun Gildea
- Running time: 22-26 minutes

Original release
- Network: Animal Planet
- Release: December 7, 2007 – 2008

The A-List is a 14 episode reality television series directed by David P. Levin for Animal Planet. Every episode classifies animals into categories for which they are known best. It was shown on Animal Planet from 2007–2008. Each episode of the series has a celebrity or comedian guest star who is tangentially related to the premise of the episode (Such as Gloria Gaynor, singer of I Will Survive, appearing in the episode 'Survivors') to narrate while footage of each animal in the ranking is played. To market the show animal planets website released a 'Flirt of the Month' 2008 pin up calendar, two Adobe Flash games, and a "who's on your a-list" section of their website where viewers could vote for their own animal rankings. The show shares many similarities with Animal Planet's prior ranking series The Most Extreme, with many of the episode titles, animal subjects and rankings being lifted directly from it.

== Episodes ==
Season 1
No. Overall	Original Airdate	Title	Guest Star
1	December 7, 2007	Troublemakers	Danny Bonaduce
2	December 7, 2007	Outrageous Flirts	Jackee Harry
3	December 14, 2007	Dads	James Eckhouse & Don Grady
4	December 14, 2007	Survivors	Gloria Gaynor & Colby Donaldson
5	December 21, 2007	Lovers	Trista Sutter & Ryan Sutter
6	December 21, 2007	Loudmouths	Gilbert Gottfried
7	January 4, 2008	Moms	Shirley Jones
8	January 11, 2008	Cheaters	Wayne Hoffman
9	January 18, 2008	Horrors	unknown
10	January 25, 2008	Animal Myths	unknown
11	February 1, 2008	Hissy Fits	unknown
12	2008	Gluttons	unknown
13	2008	Gross Outs	unknown
14	2008	Fashion Disasters	unknown

== Creature Countdowns ==
The Animal Planet possessed a typed compilation of all the rankings made on the show, as well as twenty-two rankings that were not made into episodes. These non-episode rankings included:

1. Animal Dieters
2. Weirdest Animal Weapons
3. Animal Gourmets
4. Animal Workaholics
5. Animal Transformers
6. Ugliest Animals
7. Pet Vacation Spots
8. Animal Treehuggers
9. "Green" Animals
10. Dog Park Tips
11. Smartest Animals
12. Animal Performers
13. Animal Thieves
14. Animal Adaptations
15. Animal Exercises
16. Animal Skills
17. Animal Oddities
18. Predators
19. Mythical Animals
20. Extinct Animals
21. Presidential Pups
22. Animal Versus Aircraft Stories

== Reception ==
Common Sense Media rated the show 3 out of 5 stars.
