= David P. Levin =

American television producer, director and writer

- Born: August 5, 1958 (age 68); Framingham, Massachusetts
- Occupations: Producer, director, writer, editor
- Years active: 1990–current

David P. Levin (born August 5, 1958) is an American producer, director, writer and editor. In the early days of MTV, he produced Rockumentaries on Madonna and Michael Jackson, and later went on to help create and develop the "Uncensored" brand for MTV. Later on he created, produced and directed TV Land Confidential for TV Land, and also produced and directed When Pop Culture Saved America, Which Entertainment Weekly cited as one of the 10 specials to watch on the tenth anniversary of the 9/11 Terrorist Attacks. He is the founder of BrainStorm Inc., a video production company with a focus on television projects.

== Early life ==
Levin was born in Framingham, Massachusetts. He grew up in Teaneck, New Jersey, and graduated from Teaneck High School.

Levin attended Rutgers University, where he created Knight Time Productions in 1979, the first student-run television production group at the university. Prior to the establishment of RU-TV in 1999, this group was responsible for all the student television on the New Brunswick Campus of Rutgers.

== Career ==
Upon graduation, Levin began as an editor, and later worked as a director/producer/writer for a variety of companies, including American Movie Classics, USA Network and MTV. While at MTV, he produced several episodes of the "Rockumentaries" series, including Madonna, Elton John and Michael Jackson.

Levin co-created the long-running, Emmy nominated series "MTV Uncensored" for the network. Later he went on to create "TV Land Confidential", "The A-List", for Animal Planet, and the pilot for the comedy series "Take Two" which starred Anson Williams, Don Most and Beth Littleford.

In 2011, Levin wrote, directed and produced "When Pop Culture Saved America", a documentary commemorating the tenth anniversary of the September 11 attacks. The show dealt with the impact of pop culture on the country in the aftermath of the attacks, and how they helped to heal the United States. The documentary premiered on A&E's The Biography Channel without commercial interruption on the tenth anniversary of the attacks.

Levin has also written several books: two children's story books featuring Superman as well as MTV Uncensored, a coffee-table book released for the twentieth anniversary of MTV. Levin was also the writer of what is thought to be one of the rarest Superman comics ever published, titled "This Island Bradman" (artwork by Curt Swan), a comic book that was privately commissioned in 1988 by real estate tycoon Godfrey Bradman as a Bar Mitzvah gift for his son. He also wrote one of the issues of DC Comics Bonus Book, for issue #24 of Justice League International in February 1989.

Levin is also the host and executive producer of "POP GOES THE CULTURE TV", a YouTube channel.

Levin is co-creator of "Monsters Aren't Real???", a new AI slop comedy series along with children's author, Nancy E. Krulik, slated for release in 2026.
