= Phil Jasner =

American journalist

- Born: Philip Mark Jasner; March 24, 1942; Philadelphia, Pennsylvania, U.S.
- Died: December 3, 2010 (aged 68); Philadelphia, Pennsylvania, U.S.
- Education: Temple University
- Occupation: Sports journalist
- Years active: 1972–2010
- Notable credit(s): Naismith Basketball Hall of Fame; Philadelphia Jewish Sports Hall of Fame; Overbrook High School Hall of Fame; Temple University School of Communications and Theater's Hall of Fame; Philadelphia Sports Hall of Fame (2010)

Philip Mark Jasner (March 24, 1942 – December 3, 2010) was a sports journalist in Philadelphia.

== Early life and education ==
Jasner was born in Philadelphia on March 24, 1942. He was a graduate of Temple University, where he worked at The Temple News.

== Career ==
Jansner began his career with the Pottsville Mercury in Pottsville, Pennsylvania, Montgomery Newspapers in Fort Washington, Pennsylvania, the Norristown Times-Herald in Norristown, Pennsylvania, and The Trentonian in Trenton, New Jersey.

=== Philadelphia Daily News ===
In 1972, Jasner joined the staff of the Philadelphia Daily News. He covered the Philadelphia 76ers and the NBA on a full-time basis from 1981 until his death. Jasner was a past president of the Professional Basketball Writers Association and the Philadelphia College Basketball Writers Association. He was the Pennsylvania Sports Writer of the Year for 1999, and was presented the 2004 Curt Gowdy Media Award, presented by the Naismith Basketball Hall of Fame for outstanding contributions to the sport during his career; he was a finalist for the award in 2001, when he also received a lifetime achievement award from the Professional Basketball Writers Association during the NBA Finals. He covered high school sports, the Philadelphia Big 5, the Eagles and the NFL, the World Football League, the North American Soccer League, and what was then the Major Indoor Soccer League.

== Death ==
Jasner died in Philadelphia on December 3, 2010.
