= When Pop Culture Saved America =

2011 film by David P. Levin

- Title screen from the documentary
- Genre: Documentary
- Created by: David P. Levin
- Written by: David P. Levin; Emmett Williams
- Directed by: David P. Levin
- Starring: Kristin Chenoweth; Idina Menzel; Denis Leary; Dan Rather; Regis Philbin; Ray Romano
- Narrated by: Alan Kalter

Production
- Executive producers: David P. Levin (Brainstorm); David McKillop (Biography); Lily Neumeyer (Biography)
- Producer: Emmett Williams
- Cinematography: Martin Cole; Christian Meyers
- Editors: Barry Hirschberg; David P. Levin; Memo Salazar
- Running time: 120 minutes

Original release
- Release: September 5, 2011

When Pop Culture Saved America is an American documentary dealing with how American culture helped the country deal with the 9/11 terrorist attacks on the United States. Produced by David P. Levin, the film consists of interviews with stars and personalities such as Kristin Chenoweth, Idina Menzel, Denis Leary, Dan Rather, Regis Philbin, and Ray Romano. It was produced by Brainstorm, Inc. for The Biography Channel (now called FYI), as part of their remembrance of the attacks on their 10th anniversary. Which Entertainment Weekly cited as one of the 10 specials to watch on the tenth anniversary of the September 11 attacks.

== The documentary ==
As the United States prepared to remember the terror attacks of September 11, 2001 on their tenth anniversary, many television networks developed specials. The Biography Channel (Bio), one of A&E Networks' channels prepared three to be aired in observance. with an additional production slated for the A&E channel. The three slated for Bio were: When Pop Culture Saved America, I Survived ... 9/11, and Beyond: Messages from 9/11; A&E's entry was Portraits from Ground Zero. The producer, David P. Levin, interviewed almost two dozen celebrities from the worlds of television, film, theater and music to show how those in the world of entertainment chose to help the nation heal after the attack. The documentary also delved into how the terrorist attacks changed pop culture on television and in films.

The show premiered on September 5, 2011, and was aired several more times over the following week, including a prime time airing on September 11, with its final showing the following day. The show utilized Alan Kalter as its narrator. In the run-up to the anniversary of the attacks, both the New York Times and Entertainment Weekly, named the documentary to their top 10 lists of shows to watch in commemoration of the terror attacks.

Highlighted in the documentary is Alan Jackson's performance of his post-9/11 song, "Where Were You (When the World Stopped Turning)". The documentary also featured how pop culture was changed and influenced by the events of 9/11, such as the creation of the play 110 Stories, a "docu-play" which follows the course of the day as seen through the lives of ordinary people who lived through it.

== Appearances ==
The list of interviewees ran the gamut of the entertainment industry: theater, film, prime time and daytime television, and music.

- Danny Aiello
- Richard Belzer
- Kristin Chenoweth
- Billy Ray Cyrus
- Gilbert Gottfried
- Patricia Heaton
- Alan Jackson
- Paul McCartney
- Idina Menzel
- Dan Rather
- Tony Roberts
- Ray Romano
- Stelio Savante
- Bruce Springsteen
- Jon Stewart
- Steven Van Zandt
- Ben Vereen
- Max Weinberg
- David Zayas
