= Rupert Jee =

American businessman (born 1956)

- Jee in October 2004
- Born: July 16, 1956 (age 70)
- Education: City University of New York
- Occupation: Businessman
- Known for: Hello Deli

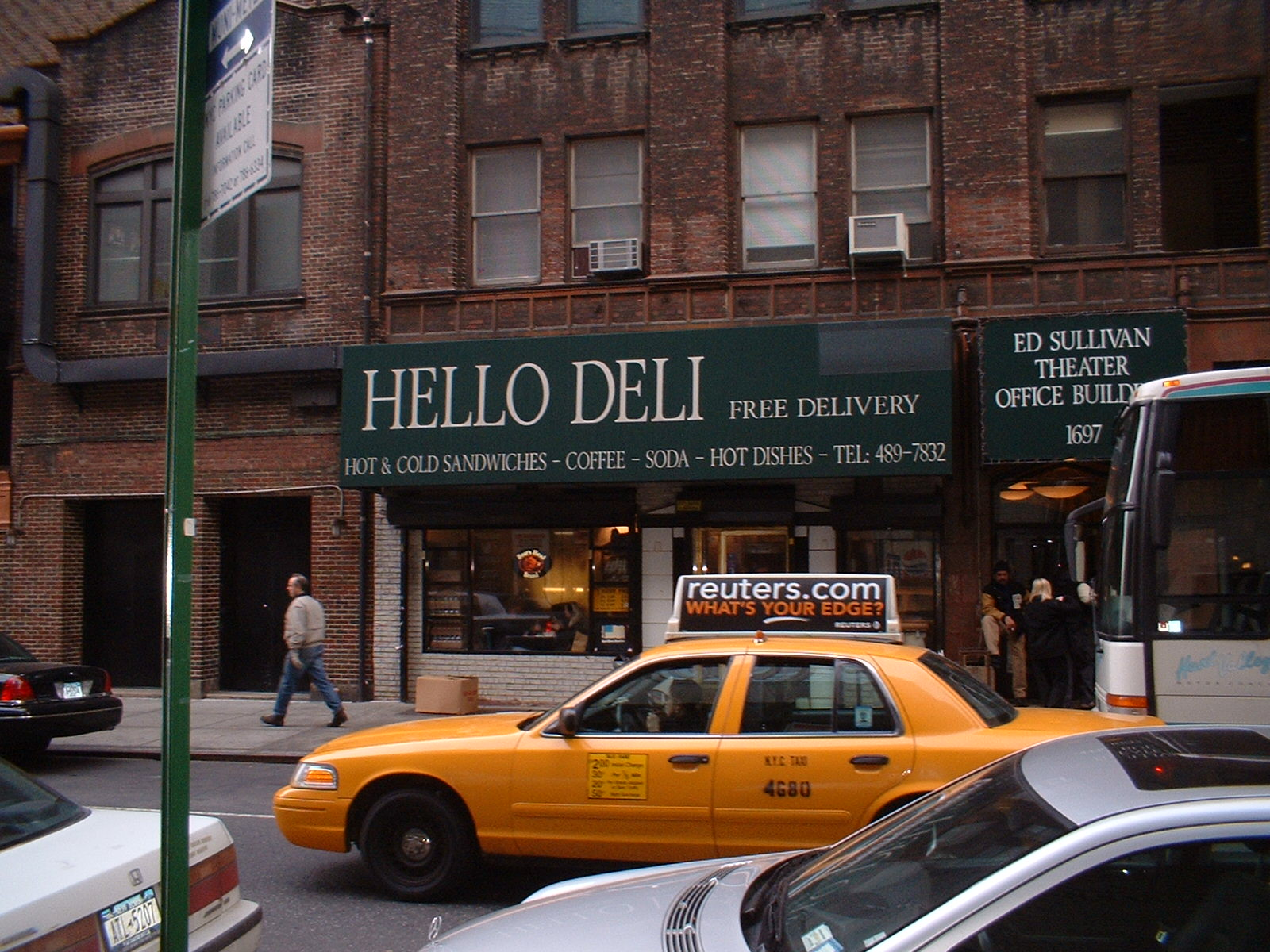
Exterior of the "Hello Deli"

Rupert Jee (born July 16, 1956) is an American entrepreneur, former deli owner, and television personality who gained fame from his frequent appearances on Late Show with David Letterman, on which he sometimes used the alter ego Kenny. He first appeared on the Late Show during a "Meet the Neighbors" segment on September 20, 1993, and was a frequent accomplice of host David Letterman during the show's many comedic segments. He appeared on the show over 400 times.

Jee was born in the United States to parents who were from China.

He made an appearance on the January 7, 2016 episode of The Late Show with Stephen Colbert.

== Hello Deli ==
With business partner May Chin, Jee co-owned the Hello Deli in New York City, which is located at 213 W 53rd St, adjacent to the Ed Sullivan Theater where the Late Show is taped. His deli is one of the neighborhood's last remaining small businesses. On the day Colbert's team moved into the theatre, he renamed one of the deli's sandwiches in Colbert's honor, but as of 2022 the sandwich returned to its former name.

Hello Deli marked thirty years in business on January 31, 2022. On March 18, 2023, Jee and Chin announced their desire to retire and sell. The deli closed for over a year and has since reopened under new owners and management.
