= U.S. Basketball Writers Association =

Sports journalism association

The United States Basketball Writers Association (USBWA) was founded in 1956 with the urging of National Collegiate Athletic Association director Walter Byers to serve the interests of journalists who cover college basketball.

== Scholarships ==
The USBWA annually awards college scholarships to students pursuing careers in sports journalism and to children of USBWA members.

== Awards ==
The USBWA annually selects a player of the year and All-America teams for both men and women in college basketball. The USBWA men's player of the year award, called the Oscar Robertson Trophy, was first established in 1959 and is considered to be the nation's oldest such award in college basketball. The USBWA also selects a national coach of the year for men and women, with the men's award named after coach Henry Iba and the women's award being named after Geno Auriemma starting with the 2025 award. The USBWA also chooses a USBWA National Freshman of the Year in men's and women's basketball, respectively named for Wayman Tisdale and Tamika Catchings.

In addition, the USBWA presents a number of other awards:

- Two Most Courageous Awards—one for men's basketball, and the other for women's basketball. Each is presented to a player, coach, official, or other individual connected with college basketball who demonstrates extraordinary courage in life. The women's version has been officially known as the Pat Summitt Most Courageous Award, named after the legendary Tennessee coach, since 2012. Effective with the 2021 awards, the men's version is officially the Perry Wallace Most Courageous Award, named after the Vanderbilt player who was the first African American to play that sport in the Southeastern Conference.
- The Katha Quinn award, in honor of the former Sports Information Director at St. John's University, to individuals who have excelled servicing the media or provide an inspiration to sports writers.

USBWA also divides the country into nine districts, naming for each a Player of the Year, Coach of the Year, and an All-District Team.

USBWA Districts
District	States
I	Maine, Vermont, New Hampshire, Rhode Island, Massachusetts, Connecticut
II	New York, New Jersey, Delaware, Washington, D.C., Pennsylvania, West Virginia
III	Virginia, North Carolina, South Carolina, Maryland
IV	Kentucky, Tennessee, Mississippi, Alabama, Georgia, Florida
V	Ohio, Indiana, Illinois, Michigan, Minnesota, Wisconsin
VI	Iowa, Missouri, Kansas, Oklahoma, Nebraska, North Dakota, South Dakota
VII	Texas, Arkansas, Louisiana
VIII	Wyoming, Utah, Idaho, New Mexico, Colorado, Nevada, Montana
IX	California, Oregon, Washington, Hawaii, Arizona, Alaska

== Hall of fame ==
The USBWA also honors past and current members for career achievements with the USBWA Hall of Fame.

== See also ==
- Pro Basketball Writers Association
- National Collegiate Baseball Writers Association
- Baseball Writers' Association of America
- Football Writers Association of America (college)
- Pro Football Writers Association
- Professional Hockey Writers Association
- National Sports Media Association

== External ==
- Official website
