= Biff Henderson =

American television personality (born 1946)

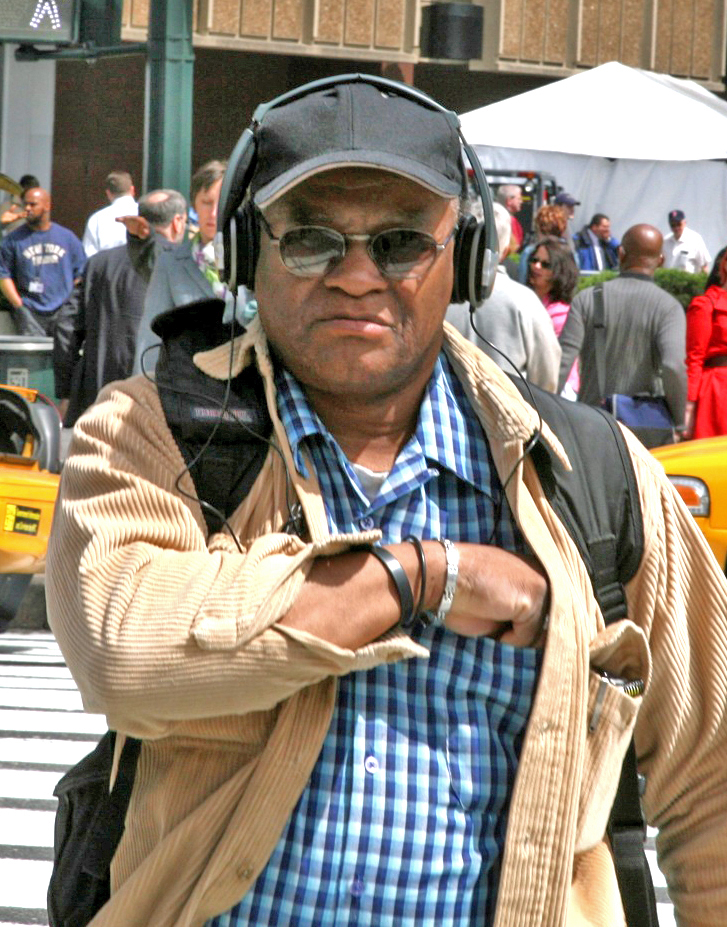
- Biff Henderson in New York City.
- Born: James Jackson Henderson, Jr. October 3, 1946 (age 80); Durham, North Carolina, U.S.
- Occupations: Stage manager for: To Tell the Truth (1969); The David Letterman Show (1980); Late Night with David Letterman (1982–93); Late Show with David Letterman (1993–2015)
- Employer(s): NBC; CBS

James Jackson "Biff" Henderson, Jr. (born October 3, 1946) is an American comedian and television personality best known for his work on the Late Show with David Letterman. He was the show's stage manager and appeared in occasional humorous segments, which often involved interviewing people at public places and events.

== Early life and education ==
Henderson was born in Durham, North Carolina, in the Hayti District. He acquired the nickname "Biff" from his mother when her friend had a dream involving a boy named "Biff". Henderson played tennis in his school years. One of his friends and opponents was tennis legend Arthur Ashe. Henderson graduated from Hillside High School in Durham, and earned a degree in business administration from Hampton Institute. He also served in the United States Army and deployed to Vietnam during the Vietnam War.

== Career ==
In 1970, Henderson had been in New York to interview with The Hertz Corporation, which at the time had been co-owned with NBC by the Radio Corporation of America. His need for a restroom in the RCA Building led to a chance encounter with a janitor who introduced him to an NBC sales executive. He would join NBC, working first for the NBC Radio Sales Services and Station Clearances Department and then as stage manager during NBC's coverage of the World Series, coverage of various NASA missions, plus shows such as Today and To Tell the Truth.

His association with David Letterman, which spanned 35 years, began in 1980 as a stage manager on The David Letterman Show (NBC). He rejoined Letterman with the launch of Late Night with David Letterman (NBC) in 1982, remaining with it and Late Show with David Letterman (CBS) for their entire runs. Henderson frequently participated in the on-screen antics and sometimes was the star of short segments recounting his humorous adventures in New York. Henderson's "theme" music on the show was "Milestones" by Miles Davis.

Henderson took part in a Jimmy Kimmel Live! skit honoring Back to the Future during a Kimmel broadcast from Brooklyn in October 2015. When Michael J. Fox (as Marty McFly) and Christopher Lloyd (as Emmett Brown) ask Kimmel what became of their nemesis Biff Tannen, Henderson came onstage, prompting "Marty" to tell Kimmel, "no, not that Biff."
