= Nancy E. Krulik =

American author

- Born: New York City, U.S.
- Occupation: Novelist
- Spouse: Daniel Burwasser
- Children: 2
- Writing career
- Language: English
- Period: 1994–present
- Genre: Children's fiction

Nancy E. Krulik (born in Brooklyn, New York) is the author of more than 200 books for children and young adults, including three New York Times bestsellers.

== Books ==
Krulik is the author and creator of several book series, beginning with Katie Kazoo, Switcheroo in 2002. The How I Survived Middle School series launched in June 2007. In July 2008, Grosset and Dunlap (a division of Penguin Young Readers) launched the George Brown, Class Clown series, a spin-off of Katie Kazoo, with the book Super Burp. Her mystery series for kids, Jack Gets a Clue launched in 2011. In 2013, she published the Magic Bone series, which follows the adventures of Sparky, a sheepdog puppy, who travels the world thanks to the magic he finds in a very special chew toy. The first two books in the series: Be Careful What You Sniff For and Catch that Wave were published in May. Krulik followed that series with Project Droid, a science fiction series of six books written with her daughter Amanda Burwasser, The Kid From Planet Z (a young chapter book series about a family who crashes down on earth and must follow the instructions of their leader, a talking cat named Zeus), and Princess Pulverizer, a series about a princess who wants to be a knight and must go on a Quest of Kindness to prove that she is up to the task. Along the way Princess Pulverizer meets up with a dragon who uses his fire to make grilled cheese, and a timid knight-in-training who has been nicknamed Lucas the Lily-Livered. Krulik introduced the Ms. Frogbottom's Field Trips Series in 2021. The first book in her The Great Mathemachicken series was published the following year.

She has also written a number of celebrity biographies for young readers, including a biography of Leonardo DiCaprio that made the New York Times bestseller list.

== Children's Media ==
Nancy Krulik has also delved into children's media, having been a staff writer for Nick Jr.'s Eureeka's Castle and more recently a creator and writer on Monsters Aren't Real??? an independent cartoon show for kids, produced with Emmy award winning director and producer David P. Levin, head of Brainstorm Inc. The series is currently in pre-production and set to launch in 2026.

== Personal life ==
Nancy Krulik graduated with a degree in journalism from Temple University in Philadelphia, and currently lives in Manhattan with her husband, composer Daniel Burwasser and their rescue Lhasa apso. Her daughter Amanda is a writer and teacher in Northern California, and her son, Ian is a musician and voice actor in Los Angeles.

== Bibliography ==
=== Standalone ===
Title	Publication date	Publisher
M.c. Hammer and Vanilla Ice: The Hip-hop Never Stops	January 1, 1991	Scholastic Inc.
Dawn's Early Light	March 8, 2006	Simon & Schuster Books for Young Readers

=== Katie Kazoo, Switcheroo series ===
1. Anyone But Me
2. Out to Lunch
3. Oh, Baby!
4. Girls Don't Have Cooties
5. I Hate Rules!
6. Get Lost!
7. Drat! You Copycat!
8. Doggone It!
9. Any Way You Slice It
10. Quiet on the Set!
11. No Messin' with My Lesson
12. No Bones About It
13. On Your Mark, Get Set, Laugh!
14. Friends for Never
15. Love Stinks!
16. Bad Rap
17. Write On!
18. Karate Katie
19. Gotcha! Gotcha Back!
20. Be Nice to Mice
21. I'm Game!
22. It's Snow Joke
23. Open Wide
24. No Biz Like Show Biz
25. My Pops Is Tops!
26. Something's Fishy
27. Flower Power
28. Free the Worms!
29. Major League Mess-Up
30. Horsing Around
31. Tip-Top Tappin' Mom!
32. Going Batty
33. Red, White and-Achoo!
34. Hair Today, Gone Tomorrow
35. Three Cheers for...Who?

==== Katie Kazoo specials ====
1. Who's Afraid of Fourth Grade?
2. A Whirlwind Vacation
3. A Katie Kazoo Christmas
4. Witch Switch
5. Camp Rules!
6. On Thin Ice
7. Holly's Jolly Christmas!
8. Don't Be Such a Turkey!

=== How I Survived Middle School series ===
1. Can You Get an F in Lunch?
2. Madame President
3. I Heard a Rumor
4. The New Girl
5. Cheat Sheet
6. P.S. I Really Like You
7. Who's Got Spirit?
8. It's All Downhill from Here
9. Caught in the Web
10. Into the Woods
11. Wish Upon a Star
12. I Thought We Were Friends!

==== How I Survived Middle School specials ====
1. How the Pops Stole Christmas

=== The Great Mathemachicken Series ===
1. Hide and Go Beak
2. Anyway You Slice It
3. Sing High Sing Crow

=== George Brown, Class Clown series ===
#	Title	Publication date	Publisher
1	Super Burp!	July 8, 2010	Penguin Random House
2	Trouble Magnet	July 8, 2010	Penguin Random House
3	World's Worst Wedgie	September 16, 2010	Penguin Random House
4	What's Black and White and Stinks All Over?	February 17, 2011	Penguin Random House
5	Wet and Wild!	June 30, 2011	Penguin Random House
6	Help! I'm Stuck in a Giant Nostril	October 13, 2011	Penguin Random House
7	Attack of the Tighty Whities!	February 16, 2012	Penguin Random House
8	Hey! Who Stole the Toilet?	June 14, 2012	Penguin Random House
9	Dance Your Pants Off!	February 7, 2013	Penguin Random House
10	Three Burps and You're Out	June 13, 2013	Penguin Random House
11	Eww! What's on My Shoe?	October 17, 2013	Penguin Random House
12	Lice Check	February 20, 2014	Penguin Random House
13	How Do You Pee in Space?	November 13, 2014	Penguin Random House
14	'Snot Funny	February 5, 2015	Penguin Random House
15	A Royal Pain in the Burp	June 9, 2015	Penguin Random House
16	Revenge of the Killer Worms	October 16, 2015	Penguin Random House
17	It's a Bird, It's a Plane, It's Toiletman!	February 16, 2016	Penguin Random House
18	Dribble, Dribble, Drool	September 27, 2016	Penguin Random House
19	Return to the Scene of the Burp	April 11, 2017	Penguin Random House
Super Special
	The Twelve Burps of Christmas	October 11, 2012	Penguin Random House
	Burp or Treat... Smell My Feet!	August 14, 2014	Penguin Random House

=== Jack Gets a Clue series ===
#	Title	Publication date	Publisher
1	The Case of the Beagle Burglar	July 1, 2011	Scholastic Publishing
2	The Case of the Tortoise in Trouble	July 1, 2011	Scholastic Publishing
3	The Case of the Green Guinea Pig	October 1, 2011	Scholastic Publishing
4	The Case of the Loose-Toothed Shark	February 1, 2012	Scholastic Publishing

=== Magic Bone series ===
#	Title	Publication date	Publisher
1	Be Careful What You Sniff For	May 16, 2013	Penguin Random House
2	Catch That Wave	May 16, 2013	Penguin Random House
3	Follow That Furball	November 14, 2013	Penguin Random House
4	Nice Snowing You	February 2014	Penguin Random House
5	Go Fetch	May 29, 2014	Penguin Random House
6	Don't Mess With the Ninja Puppy	October 9, 2014	Penguin Random House
7	Dogs Don't Have Webbed Feet	March 17, 2015	Penguin Random House
8	Rootin' Tootin Cow Dog	June 30, 2015	Penguin Random House
9	Pup Art	October 20, 2015	Penguin Random House
10	Broadway Doggie	February 16, 2016	Penguin Random House
11	Never Box with a Kangaroo	June 14, 2016	Penguin Random House
Super Special
	Two Tales, One Dog	October 18, 2016	Penguin Random House

=== Project Droid series ===
Project Droid was co-written with Amanda Burwasser

#	Title	Publication date	Publisher
1	Science No Fair!	September 6, 2016	Sky Pony Press
2	Soccer Shocker	September 6, 2016	Sky Pony Press
3	My Robot Ate My Homework	March 28, 2017	Sky Pony Press
4	Phone-y Friends	September 5, 2017	Sky Pony Press
5	Give a 'Bot a Bone	March 6, 2018	Sky Pony Press
6	Someone's Got a Screw Loose	September 14, 2018	Sky Pony Press

=== The Kid from Planet Z series ===
#	Title	Publication date	Publisher
1	Crash!	May 9, 2017	Penguin Random House
2	Don't Sneeze!	May 9, 2017	Penguin Random House

=== Princess Pulverizer series ===
#	Title	Publication date	Publisher
1	Grilled Cheese and Dragons	January 16, 2018	Penguin Random House
2	Worse, Worser, Wurst	January 16, 2018	Penguin Random House
3	Bad Moooove!	May 15, 2018	Penguin Random House
4	Quit Buggin' Me!	September 18, 2018	Penguin Random House
5	Watch That Witch!	April 23, 2019	Penguin Random House
6	The Dragon's Tale	May 14, 2019	Penguin Random House
7	Gotta Warn the Unicorns!	October 1, 2019	Penguin Random House
8	Yo-Ho, Yo...NO!	January 14, 2020	Penguin Random House

=== Ms. Frogbottom's Field Trips Series ===
#	Title	Publication date	Publisher	ISBN
1	I Want My Mummy!	April 13, 2021	Aladdin	9781534453968
2	Long Time No Sea Monster	April 13, 2021	Aladdin	9781534453999
3	Fangs for Having Us	July 20, 2021	Aladdin	9781534454026
4	Get a Hold of Your Elf	September 14, 2021	Aladdin	9781534454057

=== Disney novelizations ===
Title	Publication date	Publisher	ISBN
The Prince and the Pauper	October 1990	Scholastic	0-590-44364-X / 978-0-590-44364-7
Homeward Bound II: Lost in San Francisco	March 1996	Hyperion Books	0-7868-4083-8 / 978-0-7868-4083-0
Jungle 2 Jungle	April 1997	Disney Press	0-7868-4119-2 / 978-0-7868-4119-6
Mr. Magoo	December 1997	Disney Press	0-7868-4174-5 / 978-0-7868-4174-5
Doug's 1st Movie	March 1999	Disney Press	0-7868-4349-7 / 978-0-7868-4349-7

=== Disney Chapters ===
Title	Publication date	Publisher	ISBN
Doug's Big Comeback	April 1997	Disney Press	0-7868-4194-X / 978-0-7868-4194-3
Doug's Vampire Caper	September 1997	Disney Press	0-7868-4157-5 / 978-0-7868-4157-8
Mighty Ducks: Power Play	September 1997	Disney Press	0-7868-4144-3 / 978-0-7868-4144-8
Pepper Ann: Soccer Sensation	July 1998	Disney Press	0-7868-4262-8 / 978-0-7868-4262-9

=== Picture books ===
Title	Publication date	Publisher	ISBN
Superman IV	August 1987	Scholastic	0-590-41227-2 / 978-0-590-41227-8
Honey, I Shrunk the Kids	May 1989	Scholastic	0-590-42120-4 / 978-0-590-42120-1
The Norfin Trolls: Ralph Troll's New Bicycle — A Norfin Troll Tale	September 1992	Scholastic	0-590-45924-4 / 978-0-590-45924-2
Home Alone 2: Lost in New York: Kevin's Christmas Vacation Scrapbook	November 1992	Scholastic	0-590-46187-7 / 978-0-590-46187-0
The Norfin Trolls: Ballerina Trolls on Their Toes — A Norfin Troll Tale	March 1993	Scholastic	0-590-46893-6 / 978-0-590-46893-0
The Little Rascals' Movie Storybook	September 1994	Scholastic	0-590-48851-1 / 978-0-590-48851-8
Richie Rich: The Movie Storybook	December 1994	Scholastic	0-590-25087-6 / 978-0-590-25087-0
The Mask: The Animated Series: The Mask for Mayor!	January 1996	Scholastic	0-590-50206-9 / 978-0-590-50206-1
Space Jam	November 1996	Scholastic	0-590-94556-4 / 978-0-590-94556-1
Hercules: Hades: The Truth at Last	June 1997	Disney Press	0-7868-3134-0 / 978-0-7868-3134-0
Anastasia	September 1997	Golden Books	0-307-12965-9 / 978-0-307-12965-9
Doug Makes the Team	March 1999	Disney Press	0-7868-3193-6 / 978-0-7868-3193-7
