= How I Survived Middle School =

Young adult book series by Nancy Krulik

How I Survived Middle School is a series of young adult novels by American author Nancy Krulik. The series centers around a preteen girl named Jenny McAfee as she enters and goes through middle school. The series has gained popularity among both young adults and librarians for the interactions built into the series for readers, such as self-scored quizzes.

== Series ==
=== Can You Get an F in Lunch? (2006) ===
Can You Get an F in Lunch? was published in 2006. The novel starts on eleven-year-old Jenny McAffe's first day at Joyce Kilmer Middle School. She feels confident after reading the school handbook and taking a tour of the school. But she also feels confident thinking that her best friend Addie Wilson will be right there by her side. Jenny gets to school on the first day only to find out that Addie has started hanging out with the Pops, also known as the most popular kids in the school, and doesn't want anything to do with Jenny anymore. What will happen next?

=== Madame President (2006) ===
It's club sign up day at Joyce Kilmer Middle School. When Jenny's friends find out that Addie is running unopposed for sixth grade president, they convince Jenny to run against her. Who will win?

=== I Heard a Rumor (2007) ===
Joyce Kilmer Middle School has a new gossip column in the school newspaper. The column writer, Madame X, is spreading rumors about everyone. When Jenny finds a nasty, untrue rumor about her friend Chloe, she decides to find out who Madame X is. Who could it be?

=== The New Girl (2007) ===
Joyce Kilmer Middle school is hosting a carnival to raise money for charity. Jenny and Addie make a bet that the girl who raises the least money at their booth has to wear their most embarrassing pajamas to school the next day. The competition gets even more heated when a new girl from England named Sam arrives. Will she help Addie and her friends, or will she help Jenny and her friends?

=== Cheat Sheet (2007) ===
The Joyce Kilmer Middle School annual history test is coming up. The school has never had finalists before. This year, the school has two finalists, and both of them are Jenny's friends. However, one of them aren't known for doing great on tests, so the Pops start a rumor that she cheated. What's going to happen next?

=== P.S. I Really Like You ===
Someone's been sending mushy notes to Jenny claiming to be her secret admirer. Felicia and Rachel have a MEGA MEGA fight, and everyone's either in "Team Felicia" or "Team Rachel". Can Jenny find her secret admirer and mend the broken bonds between Rachel and Felicia?

=== Who's Got Spirit? ===
It's Spirit Week in Joyce Kilmer Middle School. Addie and her clique capture everyone's attention, but Jenny and the gang decide to change that. For their science experiment, Jenny and Chloe work together and Chloe is upset because the project is about mice.

=== It's All Downhill from Here ===
Addie and Jenny are stuck together on a snowy day.

==== Caught in the Web ====
Jenny and her friends decide to make a webcast and so do the Pops.

=== Into the Woods ===
Sam, Jenny and Chloe get stuck in a cabin with Dana and Addie while at a school camping trip.

=== Wish Upon a Star ===
Ticket sales for the winter dance soar when Addie boasts that she can get a pop star to attend. 2017

=== How the Pops Stole Grinchmas ===
Jenny's hopes for the winter break are spoiled when she is not invited to Mark's party – and even worse, she learns Sam is going abroad for the holidays.

=== I Thought We Were Friends ===
On Career Day, Jenny's aunt comes to give a talk and inadvertently makes Jenny jealous when she takes an interest in Liza's artwork.

== Reception ==
The series has shown to be popular with young teens and librarians alike.
