= Mike Kahn =

American sports journalist (1954–2008)

Michael Alan Kahn (June 5, 1954 – December 17, 2008) was a sports journalist, best known for his contributions, via what is now CBS Sportsline, to the beginnings of internet sports journalism.

Mike Kahn most notably started his journalistic career in Jefferson City, covering high school sports, but swiftly moved up the ranks. He soon landed a job at the Tacoma News Tribune, where he joined John Clayton and Bart Wright to create a nationally renowned sports page.

In the late '90s, Kahn moved to Florida to become one of the founders of Sportsline.com, one of the first independent sports webpages. Sportsline was eventually bought out by Viacom in 2004, which led to layoffs of many workers, including Mike. Michael then joined the Seattle Seahawks as their staff writer, until his death in 2008 from complications with lung cancer.
