= Alan Kalter =

American television announcer (1943–2021)

- Kalter on the Late Show with David Letterman
- Born: Alan Robert Kalter; March 21, 1943; Brooklyn, New York, U.S.
- Died: October 4, 2021 (aged 78); Stamford, Connecticut, U.S.
- Education: Hobart and William Smith Colleges
- Occupation: Announcer
- Years active: 1974–2015
- Spouses: Carol Cepler (divorced); Peggy Masterson (m. 2003)
- Children: 2

Alan Robert Kalter (March 21, 1943 – October 4, 2021) was an American television announcer from New York City. He is best known as the announcer for the Late Show with David Letterman, a role he held from September 4, 1995, until Letterman's retirement on May 20, 2015.

== Early life and education ==
Kalter was born in Brooklyn in 1943 and raised in Little Neck and Cedarhurst, New York. His family was Jewish. He was an English and Public Speaking teacher at Baldwin High School on Long Island in the late 1960s and was also the voice of the Michelin Man. He attended Hobart College in Geneva, New York, and began his broadcasting career on local radio stations.

== Career ==
Kalter, nicknamed "Big Red" and "TV's Uncle Jerry" by Letterman, began his stint as the "voice" of the Late Show with David Letterman on September 4, 1995, replacing the retiring Bill Wendell. He announced the guests at the top of each show and the one-liner during the Worldwide Pants title card after the credits and regularly acted in comedic sketches.

Kalter did hundreds of voiceovers for national radio and television commercials and was also the lead continuity voice for the USA Network throughout much of the 1980s and most of the 1990s (his voice was still heard on USA into the mid-2010s for the network's paid programming disclaimer, until a universal disclaimer for all NBCUniversal Cable Networks was instituted in 2017). He voiced promos for SportsChannel America in the early 1990s.

Kalter (credited as Alan Roberts) also filmed two game show pilots for CBS - The Challengers by Ron Greenberg Productions/Universal Television in April 1974, and The Finish Line by Bob Stewart Productions in October 1975. Both pilots went unsold.

Previously, he had been the announcer for many New York-based television shows, including To Tell the Truth, The $25,000 Pyramid, The Money Maze, and The $128,000 Question.

All of those series (except The Money Maze) were taped at some point in the Ed Sullivan Theater, where the Late Show would later be produced. Additionally, episodes of Truth announced by Kalter were taped in NBC Studio 6A, where Letterman later originated Late Night. Kalter would replace Bill Wendell as announcer on both Truth and the Late Show. Kalter was also the announcer for the 45th Annual Grammy Awards ceremony, held in New York in 2003.

=== Late Show ===
On the Late Show, Kalter regularly performed in scripted comedy bits in addition to his announcing duties. He was often portrayed alternately as a sexual deviant (often while grinning mischievously), a powerless sap who was beaten to within an inch of his life and left rolling on the ground writhing in pain, or frustrated at having guests for his own interview segment stolen by host David Letterman. He was also often compelled to arbitrarily sing, rant in hysteria, or disrobe as he walked offstage. In many of the sketches, Kalter's antics left host Letterman in a state of shock, amusement, disgust, or total confusion. A memorable series of sketches in the early 2000s saw Kalter reenacting movie scenes originally performed by Fred MacMurray.

== Personal life ==
Kalter lived in Stamford, Connecticut. He married Carol Cepler and they had two children, Lauren Hass and Diana Binger. After his longtime marriage to Carol Cepler ended in divorce, he married his second wife Peggy Masterson in 2003. He had five grandchildren.

Kalter died at Stamford Hospital on October 4, 2021, aged 78.

== Filmography ==
- The Money Maze (1974) TV Series as "Announcer"
- The $128,000 Question (1976) TV Series (uncredited) as "Announcer"
- Ed (2000)
- Get Well Soon (2001) as "Announcer"
- When Pop Culture Saved America as "Narrator"

Media offices
Preceded by Bill Wendell	The Late Show announcer September 4, 1995 – May 20, 2015	Succeeded by Jen Spyra; Announcer
