= 2002–03 United States network television schedule (late night) =

These are the late-night schedules for the four United States broadcast networks that offer programming during this time period, from September 2002 to August 2003. All times are Eastern or Pacific. Affiliates will fill non-network schedule with local, syndicated, or paid programming. Affiliates also have the option to preempt or delay network programming at their discretion.

In January 2003, Jimmy Kimmel debuted as the late-night talk show host of Jimmy Kimmel Live! on ABC.

== Legend ==
- Light blue indicates Local programming.
- Gray indicates encore programming.
- Yellow indicates late night talk or variety shows.
- Gold indicates network news programming.

== Schedule ==
=== Monday-Friday ===
| Network | | 11:00 PM | 11:35 PM | 12:00 AM | 12:30 AM | 1:00 AM | 1:35 AM | 2:00 AM | 2:30 AM | 3:00 AM | 3:30 AM | 4:00 AM | 4:30 AM | 5:00 AM | 5:30 AM |
|---|---|---|---|---|---|---|---|---|---|---|---|---|---|---|---|
| ABC | Fall | Local Programming | Nightline | ABC News Up Close | Local Programming | | | ABC World News Now | | | | | | ABC World News This Morning | |
| ABC | Winter | Local Programming | Nightline | Jimmy Kimmel Live! (12:07) | | Local Programming | | ABC World News Now | | | | | | ABC World News This Morning | |
| CBS | | Local Programming | Late Show with David Letterman | | The Late Late Show with Craig Kilborn | | Local Programming | Up to the Minute | | | | | | CBS Morning News | |
| NBC | | Local Programming | The Tonight Show with Jay Leno | | Late Night with Conan O'Brien (12:35) | | Last Call with Carson Daly | Local Programming | | The Tonight Show with Jay Leno (R) | | Local Programming | Early Today | Local Programming | |

=== Saturday ===
| Network | 11:00 PM | 11:30 PM | 12:00 AM | 12:30 AM | 1:00 AM | 1:30 AM | 2:00 AM | 2:30 AM | 3:00 AM | 3:30 AM | 4:00 AM | 4:30 AM | 5:00 AM | 5:30 AM |
|---|---|---|---|---|---|---|---|---|---|---|---|---|---|---|
| NBC | Local Programming | Saturday Night Live | | | Local Programming | | | | | | | | | |
| Fox | MADtv | | Local Programming | | | | | | | | | | | |

== By network ==
=== ABC ===
Returning series

- ABC News Up Close
- ABC World News Now
- ABC World News This Morning
- Nightline

New series

- Jimmy Kimmel Live!

Not returning from 2001-02:

- Politically Incorrect with Bill Maher

=== CBS ===
Returning series

- CBS Morning News
- Late Show with David Letterman
- The Late Late Show with Craig Kilborn
- Up to the Minute

=== Fox ===
Returning series

- MADtv

=== NBC ===
Returning series

- Early Today
- Last Call with Carson Daly
- Late Night with Conan O'Brien
- Saturday Night Live
- The Tonight Show with Jay Leno

Not returning from 2001-02:

- Late Friday
- Later Presents SCTV
