= List of Later with Greg Kinnear episodes (1996) =

This is the list of episodes for Later with Greg Kinnear in 1996.

== 1996 ==
=== January ===
No.	Original release date	Guest(s)
289	January 2, 1996	Emerson Fittipaldi

No.	Original release date	Guest(s)
290	January 24, 1996	Angie Dickinson

No.	Original release date	Guest(s)
291	January 25, 1996	Kevin Nealon

No.	Original release date	Guest(s)
292	January 29, 1996	Peter Weller

No.	Original release date	Guest(s)
293	January 30, 1996	Henry Jaglom

No.	Original release date	Guest(s)
294	January 31, 1996	Treat Williams

=== February ===
No.	Original release date	Guest(s)
295	February 1, 1996	Mary Steenburgen

No.	Original release date	Guest(s)
296	February 5, 1996	Fran Lebowitz

No.	Original release date	Guest(s)
297	February 6, 1996	Eriq LaSalle

No.	Original release date	Guest(s)
298	February 7, 1996	Dean Koontz

No.	Original release date	Guest(s)
299	February 8, 1996	Andy Garcia

No.	Original release date	Guest(s)
300	February 12, 1996	Michael McKean

No.	Original release date	Guest(s)
301	February 13, 1996	Bill Pullman

No.	Original release date	Guest(s)
302	February 14, 1996	Howie Long

No.	Original release date	Guest(s)
303	February 15, 1996	Ellen DeGeneres

No.	Original release date	Guest(s)
304	February 19, 1996	Bill Bradley

No.	Original release date	Guest(s)
305	February 21, 1996	Dick Clark

No.	Original release date	Guest(s)
306	February 22, 1996	Ann-Margret

No.	Original release date	Guest(s)
307	February 26, 1996	Matt LeBlanc

No.	Original release date	Guest(s)
308	February 27, 1996	Sharon Lawrence

No.	Original release date	Guest(s)
309	February 28, 1996	Lisa Loeb

No.	Original release date	Guest(s)
310	February 29, 1996	Richard Lewis

=== March ===
No.	Original release date	Guest(s)
311	March 4, 1996	Marlin Fitzwater

No.	Original release date	Guest(s)
312	March 5, 1996	John Larroquette

No.	Original release date	Guest(s)
313	March 6, 1996	Joely Fisher

No.	Original release date	Guest(s)
314	March 7, 1996	Rob Schneider

No.	Original release date	Guest(s)
315	March 18, 1996	Jon Stewart (guest host); Bonnie Hunt

No.	Original release date	Guest(s)
316	March 19, 1996	Jon Stewart (guest host); John Doe

No.	Original release date	Guest(s)
317	March 20, 1996	Jon Stewart (guest host); Mare Winningham

No.	Original release date	Guest(s)
318	March 21, 1996	Jon Stewart (guest host); Chazz Palminteri

No.	Original release date	Guest(s)
319	March 25, 1996	Alexandra Wentworth (guest host); Joel Schumacher

No.	Original release date	Guest(s)
320	March 26, 1996	Alexandra Wentworth (guest host); Dan Cortese

No.	Original release date	Guest(s)
321	March 27, 1996	Jay Thomas (guest host); William H. Macy

No.	Original release date	Guest(s)
322	March 28, 1996	Jay Thomas (guest host); Pam Dawber

=== April ===
No.	Original release date	Guest(s)
323	April 1, 1996	Jon Stewart (guest host); Dennis Franz

No.	Original release date	Guest(s)
324	April 2, 1996	Jon Stewart (guest host); Jennifer Tilly

No.	Original release date	Guest(s)
325	April 3, 1996	Jon Stewart (guest host); Robert Rodriguez

No.	Original release date	Guest(s)
326	April 4, 1996	Jon Stewart (guest host); Daisy Fuentes

No.	Original release date	Guest(s)
327	April 8, 1996	David Alan Grier (guest host); Martin Mull

No.	Original release date	Guest(s)
328	April 9, 1996	David Alan Grier (guest host); Walter Mosley

No.	Original release date	Guest(s)
329	April 10, 1996	David Alan Grier (guest host); Margaret Cho

No.	Original release date	Guest(s)
330	April 11, 1996	David Alan Grier (guest host); Jon Lovitz

No.	Original release date	Guest(s)
331	April 15, 1996	Jeff Cesario (guest host); Tom Poston

No.	Original release date	Guest(s)
332	April 16, 1996	Jeff Cesario (guest host); Peri Gilpin

No.	Original release date	Guest(s)
333	April 17, 1996	Peter Tilden (guest host); Robert Shapiro

No.	Original release date	Guest(s)
334	April 18, 1996	Peter Tilden (guest host); Jason Alexander

No.	Original release date	Guest(s)
335	April 22, 1996	George Wallace (guest host); Jerry Seinfeld

No.	Original release date	Guest(s)
336	April 23, 1996	George Wallace (guest host); Tom Joyner

No.	Original release date	Guest(s)
337	April 25, 1996	Dennis Miller

No.	Original release date	Guest(s)
338	April 29, 1996	Arianna Huffington

No.	Original release date	Guest(s)
339	April 30, 1996	Allen & Albert Hughes

=== May ===
No.	Original release date	Guest(s)
340	May 1, 1996	Sela Ward

No.	Original release date	Guest(s)
341	May 2, 1996	David Schwimmer

No.	Original release date	Guest(s)
342	May 6, 1996	Cary Elwes

No.	Original release date	Guest(s)
343	May 7, 1996	Hank Azaria

No.	Original release date	Guest(s)
344	May 8, 1996	Steven Bochco

No.	Original release date	Guest(s)
345	May 9, 1996	Carol Kane

No.	Original release date	Guest(s)
346	May 13, 1996	Pete Hamill

No.	Original release date	Guest(s)
347	May 14, 1996	Harland Williams

No.	Original release date	Guest(s)
348	May 15, 1996	David Paymer

No.	Original release date	Guest(s)
349	May 16, 1996	Kim Coles

No.	Original release date	Guest(s)
350	May 20, 1996	Dennis Prager

No.	Original release date	Guest(s)
351	May 21, 1996	Mark Curry

No.	Original release date	Guest(s)
352	May 22, 1996	E. Jean Carroll

No.	Original release date	Guest(s)
353	May 27, 1996	Geraldo Rivera (guest host); Kato Kaelin

No.	Original release date	Guest(s)
354	May 28, 1996	Geraldo Rivera (guest host); Gerald Uelmen

No.	Original release date	Guest(s)
355	May 29, 1996	Geraldo Rivera (guest host); Edward James Olmos

No.	Original release date	Guest(s)
356	May 30, 1996	Geraldo Rivera (guest host); Cheech Marin

=== June ===
No.	Original release date	Guest(s)
357	June 3, 1996	Eric Tunney (guest host); John Frankenheimer

No.	Original release date	Guest(s)
358	June 4, 1996	Eric Tunney (guest host); Anne Marie Johnson

No.	Original release date	Guest(s)
359	June 5, 1996	Richard Belzer (guest host); Harry Dean Stanton

No.	Original release date	Guest(s)
360	June 6, 1996	Richard Belzer (guest host); Sophie B. Hawkins

No.	Original release date	Guest(s)
361	June 10, 1996	Bill Zehme (guest host); Sandra Bernhard

No.	Original release date	Guest(s)
362	June 11, 1996	Bill Zehme (guest host); Steve Forbes

No.	Original release date	Guest(s)
363	June 12, 1996	Jeff Ross (guest host); Milton Berle

No.	Original release date	Guest(s)
364	June 13, 1996	Jeff Ross (guest host); Ice T

No.	Original release date	Guest(s)
365	June 17, 1996	Marc Maron (guest host); Robert Loggia

No.	Original release date	Guest(s)
366	June 18, 1996	Marc Maron (guest host); David O. Russell

No.	Original release date	Guest(s)
367	June 19, 1996	Al Roker (guest host); Larry Miller

No.	Original release date	Guest(s)
368	June 20, 1996	Al Roker (guest host); Jada Pinkett Smith

No.	Original release date	Guest(s)
369	June 24, 1996	Carol Leifer (guest host); Bill Maher

No.	Original release date	Guest(s)
370	June 25, 1996	Carol Leifer (guest host); Laura Schlessinger

=== September ===
No.	Original release date	Guest(s)
371	September 9, 1996	Jane Curtin

No.	Original release date	Guest(s)
372	September 10, 1996	Edward Burns

No.	Original release date	Guest(s)
373	September 11, 1996	Sean Young

No.	Original release date	Guest(s)
374	September 12, 1996	Dennis Franz

No.	Original release date	Guest(s)
375	September 16, 1996	Patty Hearst

No.	Original release date	Guest(s)
376	September 17, 1996	Doug E. Doug

No.	Original release date	Guest(s)
377	September 19, 1996	David Hyde Pierce

No.	Original release date	Guest(s)
378	September 23, 1996	Buzz Aldrin

No.	Original release date	Guest(s)
379	September 24, 1996	Harland Williams

No.	Original release date	Guest(s)
380	September 25, 1996	Tyra Banks

No.	Original release date	Guest(s)
381	September 26, 1996	Nicholas Turturro

=== October ===
No.	Original release date	Guest(s)
382	October 1, 1996	Elizabeth Berkley

No.	Original release date	Guest(s)
383	October 2, 1996	Elmore Leonard

No.	Original release date	Guest(s)
384	October 3, 1996	Renny Harlin

No.	Original release date	Guest(s)
385	October 8, 1996	Jon Lovitz

No.	Original release date	Guest(s)
386	October 9, 1996	Flea

No.	Original release date	Guest(s)
387	October 10, 1996	Garry Marshall
