= List of Later with Bob Costas episodes (season 6) =

This is a list of episodes for Season 6 of Later with Bob Costas, which aired from September 7, 1993, to February 25, 1994.

== Season 6 ==
No.	Original release date	Guest(s)
835	September 7, 1993	Joan Baez

No.	Original release date	Guest(s)
836	September 8, 1993	Denny Dillon

No.	Original release date	Guest(s)
837	September 9, 1993	Robert Klein

No.	Original release date	Guest(s)
838	September 13, 1993	Cyndi Lauper

No.	Original release date	Guest(s)
839	September 14, 1993	Tim McCarver

No.	Original release date	Guest(s)
840	September 15, 1993	Billy Joel
Part one of a three-part episode.

No.	Original release date	Guest(s)
841	September 16, 1993	Billy Joel
Part two of a three-part episode.

No.	Original release date	Guest(s)
842	September 20, 1993	Jake Johannsen

No.	Original release date	Guest(s)
843	September 21, 1993	James Earl Jones

No.	Original release date	Guest(s)
844	September 22, 1993	David Frost

No.	Original release date	Guest(s)
845	September 23, 1993	Rosanna Arquette

No.	Original release date	Guest(s)
846	October 4, 1993	Michael J. Fox
Part one of a two-part episode.

No.	Original release date	Guest(s)
847	October 5, 1993	Dawn Steel

No.	Original release date	Guest(s)
848	October 6, 1993	Sarah Jessica Parker

No.	Original release date	Guest(s)
849	October 7, 1993	David Brenner

No.	Original release date	Guest(s)
850	October 18, 1993	Lorraine Bracco

No.	Original release date	Guest(s)
851	October 19, 1993	Pierre Salinger

No.	Original release date	Guest(s)
852	October 20, 1993	Frank Gifford
Part one of a two-part episode.

No.	Original release date	Guest(s)
853	October 21, 1993	Matthew Broderick

No.	Original release date	Guest(s)
854	October 25, 1993	Matt Lauer (guest host); Charlie Watts

No.	Original release date	Guest(s)
855	October 26, 1993	Matt Lauer (guest host); Tony Bennett

No.	Original release date	Guest(s)
856	October 27, 1993	Matt Lauer (guest host); Max Weinberg

No.	Original release date	Guest(s)
857	October 28, 1993	Matt Lauer (guest host); Mimi Rogers

No.	Original release date	Guest(s)
858	November 1, 1993	Jeffrey Tambor

No.	Original release date	Guest(s)
859	November 2, 1993	Patty Duke
Part one of a two-part episode.

No.	Original release date	Guest(s)
860	November 3, 1993	Chuck Barris

No.	Original release date	Guest(s)
861	November 4, 1993	Roy Scheider
Part one of a two-part episode.

No.	Original release date	Guest(s)
862	November 8, 1993	Doc Severinsen

No.	Original release date	Guest(s)
863	November 9, 1993	Dick Enberg & Al Michaels

No.	Original release date	Guest(s)
864	November 10, 1993	Bonnie Bedelia

No.	Original release date	Guest(s)
865	November 11, 1993	Ron Reagan

No.	Original release date	Guest(s)
866	November 15, 1993	Charles Durning

No.	Original release date	Guest(s)
867	November 16, 1993	Tim Curry

No.	Original release date	Guest(s)
868	November 17, 1993	David E. Kelley

No.	Original release date	Guest(s)
869	November 18, 1993	Sean Young

No.	Original release date	Guest(s)
870	November 22, 1993	Paul Reiser

No.	Original release date	Guest(s)
871	November 23, 1993	Roy Scheider
Part two of a two-part episode.

No.	Original release date	Guest(s)
872	November 24, 1993	Valerie Bertinelli

No.	Original release date	Guest(s)
873	November 25, 1993	Alec Baldwin

No.	Original release date	Guest(s)
874	November 29, 1993	Pat Boone

No.	Original release date	Guest(s)
875	November 30, 1993	Amy Irving

No.	Original release date	Guest(s)
876	December 1, 1993	Kevin Pollak

No.	Original release date	Guest(s)
877	December 2, 1993	John Lithgow
Part one of a two-part episode.

No.	Original release date	Guest(s)
878	December 6, 1993	John Lithgow
Part two of a two-part episode.

No.	Original release date	Guest(s)
879	December 7, 1993	Joey Bishop

No.	Original release date	Guest(s)
880	December 8, 1993	Tim Russert
Part one of a two-part episode.

No.	Original release date	Guest(s)
881	December 9, 1993	Tim Russert
Part two of a two-part episode.

No.	Original release date	Guest(s)
882	December 20, 1993	Patty Duke
Part two of a two-part episode.

No.	Original release date	Guest(s)
883	December 21, 1993	Billy Joel
Part three of a three-part episode.

No.	Original release date	Guest(s)
884	December 22, 1993	Marv Albert

No.	Original release date	Guest(s)
885	December 23, 1993	Michael J. Fox
Part two of a two-part episode.

No.	Original release date	Guest(s)
886	January 3, 1994	Michael Moriarty

No.	Original release date	Guest(s)
887	January 4, 1994	Frank Gifford
Part two of a two-part episode.

No.	Original release date	Guest(s)
888	January 5, 1994	Tom Hanks
Part one of a two-part episode.

No.	Original release date	Guest(s)
889	January 6, 1994	Tom Hanks
Part two of a two-part episode.

No.	Original release date	Guest(s)
890	January 17, 1994	Larry King
Part one of a two-part episode.

No.	Original release date	Guest(s)
891	January 18, 1994	Meat Loaf

No.	Original release date	Guest(s)
892	January 19, 1994	Bill Maher

No.	Original release date	Guest(s)
893	January 20, 1994	Penelope Ann Miller

No.	Original release date	Guest(s)
894	January 31, 1994	Mike Wallace

No.	Original release date	Guest(s)
895	February 1, 1994	Pete Hamill

No.	Original release date	Guest(s)
896	February 2, 1994	Mercedes Ruehl

No.	Original release date	Guest(s)
897	February 3, 1994	Elayne Boosler

No.	Original release date	Guest(s)
898	February 7, 1994	Larry King
Part two of a two-part episode.

No.	Original release date	Guest(s)
899	February 8, 1994	Carly Simon

No.	Original release date	Guest(s)
900	February 9, 1994	Jeff Greenfield

No.	Original release date	Guest(s)
901	February 10, 1994	Rush Limbaugh

No.	Original release date	Guest(s)
902	February 14, 1994	Bill Carter

No.	Original release date	Guest(s)
903	February 15, 1994	Frank Rich

No.	Original release date	Guest(s)
904	February 16, 1994	Jon Stewart

No.	Original release date	Guest(s)
905	February 17, 1994	Peter Gallagher

No.	Original release date	Guest(s)
906	February 21, 1994	Tom Snyder

No.	Original release date	Guest(s)
907	February 22, 1994	Jason Robards

No.	Original release date	Guest(s)
908	February 23, 1994	Martin Scorsese
Part one of a two-part episode.

No.	Original release date	Guest(s)
909	February 24, 1994	Martin Scorsese
Part two of a two-part episode.

== Specials ==
No.	Title	Original release date
1	"One Last Time"	February 25, 1994
Bob Costas hosts his final episode of Later by sharing memorable moments of his time on the show before passing the torch to Greg Kinnear.
