= List of Later with Bob Costas episodes (season 4) =

This is a list of episodes for Season 4 of Later with Bob Costas, which aired from September 9, 1991, to August 13, 1992.

== Season 4 ==
| No. | Original release date | Guest(s) |
|---|---|---|
| 510 | September 9, 1991 | Marv Albert |
| 511 | September 10, 1991 | Glen Campbell |
Part one of a two-part episode.
| 512 | September 11, 1991 | Glen Campbell |
Part two of a two-part episode.
| 513 | September 12, 1991 | Gregory Hines |
| 514 | September 16, 1991 | Charlayne Hunter-Gault |
| 515 | September 17, 1991 | Ken Auletta |
| 516 | September 18, 1991 | Jackie Joyner-Kersee |
| 517 | September 19, 1991 | Kenny Loggins |
| 518 | September 23, 1991 | Thomas Hauser |
| 519 | September 24, 1991 | Anthony Quinn |
Part one of a two-part episode.
| 520 | September 25, 1991 | Anthony Quinn |
Part two of a two-part episode.
| 521 | September 26, 1991 | Don Johnson |
| 522 | September 30, 1991 | Frank Rich |
| 523 | October 1, 1991 | Ed Bradley |
Part one of a two-part episode.
| 524 | October 2, 1991 | Ed Bradley |
Part two of a two-part episode.
| 525 | October 3, 1991 | Melanie Griffith |
Part one of a two-part episode.
| 526 | October 7, 1991 | Leonard Goldenson |
| 527 | October 8, 1991 | Dick Enberg |
| 528 | October 9, 1991 | Melanie Griffith |
Part two of a two-part episode.
| 529 | October 10, 1991 | Ken Wahl |
| 530 | October 14, 1991 | Marvin Miller |
| 531 | October 16, 1991 | Mark Harmon |
Part one of a two-part episode.
| 532 | October 17, 1991 | Mark Harmon |
Part two of a two-part episode.
| 533 | October 21, 1991 | Mickey Mantle |
| 534 | October 24, 1991 | John Sayles |
| 535 | October 28, 1991 | Norman Jewison |
| 536 | October 29, 1991 | Stephen Stills |
Part one of a two-part episode.
| 537 | October 30, 1991 | Stephen Stills |
Part two of a two-part episode.
| 538 | October 31, 1991 | Louis Gossett, Jr. |
| 539 | November 4, 1991 | Jimmy Breslin |
Part one of a two-part episode.
| 540 | November 5, 1991 | Paul McCartney |
Part one of a three-part episode.
| 541 | November 6, 1991 | Paul McCartney |
Part two of a three-part episode.
| 542 | November 7, 1991 | Paul McCartney |
Part three of a three-part episode.
| 543 | November 11, 1991 | John Frankenheimer |
| 544 | November 13, 1991 | B.B. King |
| 545 | November 14, 1991 | Jim Carrey |
| 546 | November 18, 1991 | Mike Lupica |
| 547 | November 19, 1991 | Rod Steiger |
Part one of a two-part episode.
| 548 | November 20, 1991 | Rod Steiger |
Part two of a two-part episode.
| 549 | November 21, 1991 | Tyne Daly |
| 550 | November 25, 1991 | Martin Amis |
| 551 | November 26, 1991 | Wilt Chamberlain |
| 552 | November 27, 1991 | Smokey Robinson |
Part one of a two-part episode.
| 553 | November 28, 1991 | Smokey Robinson |
Part two of a two-part episode.
| 554 | December 2, 1991 | Sally Quinn |
| 555 | December 3, 1991 | Jimmy Breslin |
Part two of a two-part episode.
| 556 | December 5, 1991 | Robert Urich |
| 557 | December 9, 1991 | Jeff Greenfield |
Part one of a two-part episode.
| 558 | December 12, 1991 | Bruno Kirby |
| 559 | December 16, 1991 | Red Auerbach |
| 560 | December 17, 1991 | Judith Ivey |
| 561 | December 18, 1991 | Barry Levinson |
Part one of a two-part episode.
| 562 | December 19, 1991 | Barry Levinson |
Part two of a two-part episode.
| 563 | December 23, 1991 | Chris Elliott |
| 564 | December 25, 1991 | John Mellencamp |
Part one of a two-part episode.
| 565 | December 26, 1991 | John Mellencamp |
Part two of a two-part episode.
| 566 | December 30, 1991 | Kim Cattrall |
| 567 | December 31, 1991 | Elayne Boosler |
| 568 | January 1, 1992 | Richard Dreyfuss |
Part one of a two-part episode.
| 569 | January 2, 1992 | Richard Dreyfuss |
Part two of a two-part episode.
| 570 | January 6, 1992 | Joe McGinnis |
| 571 | January 7, 1992 | Reba McEntire |
| 572 | January 8, 1992 | Ellen DeGeneres |
| 573 | January 9, 1992 | William Devane |
| 574 | January 13, 1992 | Elie Wiesel |
Part one of a two-part episode.
| 575 | January 14, 1992 | Elie Wiesel |
Part two of a two-part episode.
| 576 | January 15, 1992 | Mary Stuart Masterson |
| 577 | January 16, 1992 | Aidan Quinn |
| 578 | January 20, 1992 | Dan Dierdorf |
| 579 | January 21, 1992 | Charles S. Dutton |
Part one of a two-part episode.
| 580 | January 22, 1992 | Charles S. Dutton |
Part two of a two-part episode.
| 581 | January 23, 1992 | Ned Beatty |
| 582 | January 30, 1992 | Cybill Shepherd |
| 583 | February 3, 1992 | Carl Lewis |
| 584 | February 4, 1992 | Tom Brokaw |
| 585 | February 5, 1992 | Oliver Stone |
Part one of a two-part episode.
| 586 | February 6, 1992 | Oliver Stone |
Part two of a two-part episode.
| 587 | February 10, 1992 | Forrest Sawyer |
Part one of a two-part episode.
| 588 | February 11, 1992 | Amanda Donohoe |
| 589 | February 12, 1992 | Randy Quaid |
| 590 | February 13, 1992 | Phil Hartman |
| 591 | February 17, 1992 | Bobby Seale |
| 592 | February 18, 1992 | Fran Lebowitz |
| 593 | February 19, 1992 | Jason Robards |
| 594 | February 20, 1992 | Eric Roberts |
| 595 | February 24, 1992 | Aaron Neville |
| 596 | February 25, 1992 | Jeff Greenfield |
Part two of a two-part episode.
| 597 | February 26, 1992 | Nora Ephron |
| 598 | February 27, 1992 | Bill Murray |
Part one of a two-part episode.
| 599 | March 2, 1992 | Bill Murray |
Part two of a two-part episode.
| 600 | March 3, 1992 | Pete Rose |
Part one of a two-part episode.
| 601 | March 4, 1992 | Pete Rose |
Part two of a two-part episode.
| 602 | March 5, 1992 | Bob Seger |
Part one of a two-part episode.
| 603 | March 9, 1992 | Bob Seger |
Part two of a two-part episode.
| 604 | March 10, 1992 | Susan Anton |
| 605 | March 12, 1992 | Ken Olin |
| 606 | March 16, 1992 | Charlie Rose |
Part one of a two-part episode.
| 607 | March 17, 1992 | Rick Mears |
| 608 | March 18, 1992 | Eli Wallach |
Part one of a two-part episode.
| 609 | March 19, 1992 | Eli Wallach |
Part two of a two-part episode.
| 610 | March 24, 1992 | Debbie Reynolds |
| 611 | March 25, 1992 | John Forsythe |
Part one of a two-part episode.
| 612 | March 26, 1992 | John Forsythe |
Part two of a two-part episode.
| 613 | March 30, 1992 | Charlie Rose |
Part two of a two-part episode.
| 614 | March 31, 1992 | Val Kilmer |
| 615 | April 1, 1992 | Jane Alexander |
| 616 | April 2, 1992 | Anthony Hopkins |
| 617 | April 6, 1992 | Forrest Sawyer |
Part two of a two-part episode.
| 618 | April 8, 1992 | Ellen Burstyn |
| 619 | April 9, 1992 | Richard Lewis |
| 620 | April 15, 1992 | Michael Moriarty |
| 621 | April 16, 1992 | John Goodman |
| 622 | April 20, 1992 | Marlee Matlin |
| 623 | April 21, 1992 | Carroll O'Connor |
| 624 | April 22, 1992 | James Woods |
Part one of a three-part episode.
| 625 | April 23, 1992 | James Woods |
Part two of a three-part episode.
| 626 | April 27, 1992 | Fred Silverman |
| 627 | April 28, 1992 | k.d. lang |
| 628 | April 29, 1992 | Rob Reiner |
Part one of a three-part episode.
| 629 | April 30, 1992 | Rob Reiner |
Part two of a three-part episode.
| 630 | May 4, 1992 | Chuck Jones |
| 631 | May 5, 1992 | Sela Ward |
| 632 | May 6, 1992 | Little Richard |
| 633 | May 7, 1992 | Paula Poundstone |
| 634 | May 11, 1992 | Sid Caesar |
Part one of a two-part episode.
| 635 | May 12, 1992 | Sid Caesar |
Part two of a two-part episode.
| 636 | May 13, 1992 | Jack Lemmon |
Part one of a three-part episode.
| 637 | May 14, 1992 | Jack Lemmon |
Part two of a three-part episode.
| 638 | May 18, 1992 | Ken Kesey |
Part one of a two-part episode.
| 639 | May 19, 1992 | Lawrence Kasdan |
Part one of a two-part episode.
| 640 | May 20, 1992 | Jay Leno |
Part one of a two-part episode.
| 641 | May 21, 1992 | Jay Leno |
Part two of a two-part episode.
| 642 | May 25, 1992 | Sinbad |
| 643 | May 26, 1992 | Richard Crenna |
| 644 | May 27, 1992 | Julie Brown |
| 645 | May 28, 1992 | Eddie Van Halen & Sammy Hagar |
| 646 | June 1, 1992 | Sheldon Leonard |
| 647 | June 2, 1992 | Julia Louis-Dreyfus |
| 648 | June 3, 1992 | Tim Burton |
Part one of a two-part episode.
| 649 | June 4, 1992 | Tim Burton |
Part two of a two-part episode.
| 650 | June 8, 1992 | Ken Kesey |
Part two of a two-part episode.
| 651 | June 9, 1992 | Gail Sheehy |
| 652 | June 10, 1992 | Glenn Frey |
Part one of a two-part episode.
| 653 | June 11, 1992 | Glenn Frey |
Part two of a two-part episode.
| 654 | August 10, 1992 | James Woods |
Part three of a three-part episode.
| 655 | August 11, 1992 | Lawrence Kasdan |
Part two of a two-part episode.
| 656 | August 12, 1992 | Jack Lemmon |
Part three of a three-part episode.
| 657 | August 13, 1992 | Rob Reiner |
Part three of a three-part episode.

== Specials ==
| No. | Title | Original release date |
|---|---|---|
| 1 | "Three Years Later" | October 3, 1991 |
Highlights across the show's three seasons on the air.
