= List of Later with Bob Costas episodes (season 3) =

This is a list of episodes for season 3 of Later with Bob Costas, which aired from September 17, 1990, to August 29, 1991.

== Season 3 ==
No.	Original release date	Guest(s)
347	September 17, 1990	Bob Greene
348	September 18, 1990	Kitty Dukakis
349	September 19, 1990	Will Smith
350	September 20, 1990	Reggie Jackson
Part one of a two-part episode.
351	September 24, 1990	Alan Arkin
352	September 25, 1990	Mike Wallace
353	September 26, 1990	Peter Bogdanovich
Part one of a two-part episode.
354	September 27, 1990	Peter Bogdanovich
Part two of a two-part episode.
355	October 1, 1990	Larry King
356	October 2, 1990	Tom Selleck
Part one of a two-part episode.
357	October 3, 1990	Tom Selleck
Part two of a two-part episode.
358	October 4, 1990	Jesse Jackson
359	October 8, 1990	David Puttnam
360	October 9, 1990	Brent Musburger
Part one of a two-part episode.
361	October 10, 1990	Brent Musburger
Part two of a two-part episode.
362	October 11, 1990	Keith Carradine
363	October 15, 1990	Mathilde Krim
364	October 16, 1990	Reggie Jackson
Part two of a two-part episode.
365	October 18, 1990	Don King
366	October 22, 1990	Bruce Morrow
367	October 23, 1990	Robert MacNeil
368	October 24, 1990	Polly Draper
369	October 25, 1990	Dennis Hopper
Part one of a two-part episode.
370	October 29, 1990	Dennis Hopper
Part two of a two-part episode.
371	October 30, 1990	Robert Altman
Part one of a two-part episode.
372	October 31, 1990	Robert Altman
Part two of a two-part episode.
373	November 1, 1990	Anthony Perkins
374	November 5, 1990	Ralph Nader
375	November 6, 1990	Hal Holbrook
376	November 7, 1990	Chris Evert
377	November 8, 1990	Martina Navratilova
378	November 12, 1990	Paula Zahn
379	November 13, 1990	Ronnie Spector
380	November 14, 1990	Carl Reiner
Part one of a two-part episode.
381	November 15, 1990	Carl Reiner
Part two of a two-part episode.
382	November 19, 1990	Mick Fleetwood
383	November 20, 1990	Tim Robbins
384	November 21, 1990	Carol Kane
385	November 22, 1990	Garry Shandling
386	November 26, 1990	George Will
387	November 27, 1990	Lorne Michaels
Part one of a two-part episode.
388	November 28, 1990	Lorne Michaels
Part two of a two-part episode.
389	November 29, 1990	Marilu Henner
390	December 3, 1990	Evander Holyfield & George Foreman
391	December 4, 1990	Diane Ladd
392	December 5, 1990	Robert Klein
393	December 6, 1990	Charlie Sheen
394	December 10, 1990	Branford Marsalis
395	December 11, 1990	Dick Schaap
396	December 12, 1990	George Carlin
Part one of a two-part episode.
397	December 13, 1990	George Carlin
Part two of a two-part episode.
398	December 17, 1990	Arthur Ashe
Part one of a two-part episode.
399	December 18, 1990	Arthur Ashe
Part two of a two-part episode.
400	December 19, 1990	Alan Dershowitz
401	December 20, 1990	Peggy Lipton
402	December 27, 1990	Keenen Ivory Wayans
403	January 1, 1991	George Plimpton
404	January 2, 1991	Pamela Reed
405	January 3, 1991	Marlo Thomas
406	January 7, 1991	George McGovern
407	January 8, 1991	Barbara Mandrell
408	January 9, 1991	Stacy Keach
409	January 10, 1991	Richard Harris
410	January 14, 1991	Tom Shales
411	January 15, 1991	Ken Burns
Part one of a two-part episode.
412	January 16, 1991	Ken Burns
Part two of a two-part episode.
413	January 21, 1991	James Brady
414	January 22, 1991	Alex Rocco
415	January 24, 1991	Penny Marshall
416	January 28, 1991	William F. Buckley
417	January 29, 1991	Dyan Cannon
418	January 30, 1991	David Crosby
Part one of a two-part episode.
419	January 31, 1991	David Crosby
Part two of a two-part episode.
420	February 4, 1991	Pete Hamill
421	February 5, 1991	Liz Smith
422	February 6, 1991	Joe Mantegna
423	February 7, 1991	Dana Carvey
424	February 11, 1991	John Goodman
425	February 12, 1991	Mary Tyler Moore
Part one of a two-part episode.
426	February 13, 1991	Mary Tyler Moore
Part two of a two-part episode.
427	February 14, 1991	Martin Sheen
Part one of a two-part episode.
428	February 18, 1991	Martin Sheen
Part two of a two-part episode.
429	February 19, 1991	David Halberstam
430	February 20, 1991	Roger McGuinn
431	February 21, 1991	Jerry Seinfeld
432	February 25, 1991	Harvey Keitel
433	February 27, 1991	Paul Simon
Part one of a three-part episode.
434	February 28, 1991	Paul Simon
Part two of a three-part episode.
435	March 11, 1991	Jane Goodall
436	March 12, 1991	Jim McKay
Part one of a two-part episode.
437	March 13, 1991	Jim McKay
Part two of a two-part episode.
438	March 14, 1991	Harry Connick, Jr.
439	March 18, 1991	Tom Snyder (guest host); Paul Schrader
440	March 19, 1991	Tom Snyder (guest host); George Wendt
441	March 20, 1991	Tom Snyder (guest host); Phil Hartman
442	March 21, 1991	Tom Snyder (guest host); Howard Stern
443	March 25, 1991	Rush Limbaugh
444	March 26, 1991	Lee Grant
445	March 27, 1991	Sarah Jessica Parker
446	March 28, 1991	Paul Simon
Part three of a three-part episode.
447	April 1, 1991	William Gaines
448	April 2, 1991	Dudley Moore
Part one of a two-part episode.
449	April 3, 1991	Dudley Moore
Part two of a two-part episode.
450	April 8, 1991	Hank Aaron
451	April 11, 1991	Karen Allen
452	April 22, 1991	Pat Sajak
453	April 23, 1991	Sharon Gless
454	April 24, 1991	Robert Duvall
Part one of a three-part episode.
455	April 25, 1991	Robert Duvall
Part two of a three-part episode.
456	April 29, 1991	Robert Townsend
457	April 30, 1991	Blake Edwards
458	May 1, 1991	Neil Simon
Part one of a two-part episode.
459	May 2, 1991	Neil Simon
Part two of a two-part episode.
460	May 6, 1991	Vin Scully
Part one of a two-part episode.
461	May 7, 1991	Henry Mancini
462	May 8, 1991	Don Rickles
Part one of a two-part episode.
463	May 9, 1991	Don Rickles
Part two of a two-part episode.
464	May 13, 1991	Bill Graham
Part one of a two-part episode.
465	May 14, 1991	Bill Graham
Part two of a two-part episode.
466	May 15, 1991	Robert Duvall
Part three of a three-part episode.
467	May 16, 1991	Lesley Ann Warren
468	May 20, 1991	Mort Sahl
469	May 21, 1991	Chuck Woolery
470	May 22, 1991	Norman Lear
Part one of a two-part episode.
471	May 23, 1991	Norman Lear
Part two of a two-part episode.
472	May 27, 1991	Julien Temple
473	May 28, 1991	Sherman Hemsley
474	May 29, 1991	Timothy Leary
Part one of a two-part episode.
475	May 30, 1991	Timothy Leary
Part two of a two-part episode.
476	June 3, 1991	Vin Scully
Part two of a two-part episode.
477	June 4, 1991	David Wolper
Part one of a two-part episode.
478	June 5, 1991	David Wolper
Part two of a two-part episode.
479	June 6, 1991	Tim Conway
480	June 10, 1991	Paul Mazursky
Part one of a two-part episode.
481	June 11, 1991	Paul Mazursky
Part two of a two-part episode.
482	June 12, 1991	Gerald Ford
Part one of a two-part episode.
483	June 13, 1991	Gerald Ford
Part two of a two-part episode.
484	June 17, 1991	Pat Sajak (guest host); Edwin Newman
485	June 18, 1991	Pat Sajak (guest host); Mark Goodson
486	June 19, 1991	Pat Sajak (guest host); Ben Gazzara
487	June 20, 1991	Pat Sajak (guest host); Rita Rudner
488	June 24, 1991	Katie Couric (guest host); Mercedes Ruehl
489	June 25, 1991	Katie Couric (guest host); Grace Mirabella
490	June 26, 1991	Katie Couric (guest host); Ray Sharkey
491	June 27, 1991	Katie Couric (guest host); Meredith Vieira
492	July 11, 1991	James Garner
Part one of a two-part episode.
493	July 15, 1991	Linda Ellerbee (guest host); Diane English
494	July 16, 1991	Linda Ellerbee (guest host); Arlo Guthrie
495	July 17, 1991	Linda Ellerbee (guest host); Peter Arnett
496	July 18, 1991	Linda Ellerbee (guest host); Mandy Patinkin
497	July 24, 1991	Art Garfunkel
Part one of a two-part appearance.
498	July 25, 1991	Art Garfunkel
Part two of a two-part appearance.
499	July 29, 1991	Mel Brooks
Part one of a four-part appearance.
500	July 30, 1991	Mel Brooks
Part two of a four-part appearance.
501	July 31, 1991	Mel Brooks
Part three of a four-part appearance.
502	August 1, 1991	Mel Brooks
Part four of a four-part appearance.
503	August 5, 1991	Russell Baker
504	August 8, 1991	Richard Lewis
505	August 19, 1991	Linda Ellerbee (guest host); Tom Clancy
506	August 20, 1991	Linda Ellerbee (guest host); Tommy Tune
507	August 21, 1991	Linda Ellerbee (guest host); Willie Nelson
Part one of a two-part episode.
508	August 22, 1991	Linda Ellerbee (guest host); Willie Nelson
Part two of a two-part episode.
509	August 29, 1991	James Garner
Part two of a two-part episode.
