= 2001–02 United States network television schedule (late night) =

These are the late night schedules for the four United States broadcast networks that offer programming during this period, from September 2001 to August 2002. All times are Eastern or Pacific. Affiliates will fill non-network schedule with local, syndicated, or paid programming. Affiliates also have the option to preempt or delay network programming at their discretion.

== Legend ==
- Light blue indicates Local programming.
- Gray indicates encore programming.
- Yellow indicates late night talk or variety shows.
- Gold indicates network news programming.

== Schedule ==
=== Monday-Friday ===
Network		11:00 PM	11:35 PM	12:00 AM	12:30 AM	1:00 AM	1:30/1:35 AM	2:00 AM	2:30 AM	3:00 AM	3:30 AM	4:00 AM	4:30 AM	5:00 AM	5:30 AM
ABC	Fall	Local Programming	Nightline	Politically Incorrect with Bill Maher (12:07)	Local Programming			ABC World News Now			Local Programming				ABC World News This Morning
ABC	Summer	Local Programming	Nightline	ABC News Up Close	Local Programming			ABC World News Now			Local Programming				ABC World News This Morning
CBS		Local Programming	Late Show with David Letterman		The Late Late Show with Craig Kilborn		Local Programming	Up to the Minute		Local Programming					CBS Morning News with Julie Chen
NBC	Fall	Local Programming	The Tonight Show with Jay Leno		Late Night with Conan O'Brien		Later Presents SCTV (Monday-Thursday); Late Friday (Friday, 1:35-2:35)	Local Programming							Early Today
NBC	Winter	Local Programming	The Tonight Show with Jay Leno		Late Night with Conan O'Brien		Last Call with Carson Daly (Mon-Thu); Late Friday (Friday, 1:35-2:35)	Local Programming							Early Today
NBC	Summer	Local Programming	The Tonight Show with Jay Leno		Late Night with Conan O'Brien		Last Call with Carson Daly	Local Programming							Early Today

Note: Politically Incorrect ended on July 5, 2002.
Note: Later aired its final episode as Later Presents SCTV on January 2, 2002, with Last Call with Carson Daly taking its place on January 8, 2002.
Note: Late Friday ended on May 24, 2002, with Last Call with Carson Daly expanding to five nights a week.

=== Saturday ===
Network	11:00 PM	11:30 PM	12:00 AM	12:30 AM	1:00 AM	1:30 AM	2:00 AM	2:30 AM	3:00 AM	3:30 AM	4:00 AM	4:30 AM	5:00 AM	5:30 AM
NBC	Local Programming	Saturday Night Live			Local Programming									
Fox	MADtv		Local Programming											

== By network ==
=== ABC ===
Returning series

- ABC World News Now
- ABC World News This Morning
- Nightline
- Politically Incorrect with Bill Maher

New series

- ABC News Up Close

=== CBS ===
Returning series

- CBS Morning News with Julie Chen
- Late Show with David Letterman
- The Late Late Show with Craig Kilborn
- Up to the Minute

=== Fox ===
Returning series

- MADtv

=== NBC ===
Returning series

- Early Today
- Late Friday
- Late Night with Conan O'Brien
- Later Presents SCTV
- Saturday Night Live
- The Tonight Show with Jay Leno

New series

- Last Call with Carson Daly

Not returning from 2000-01:

- Later
