= List of Later with Bob Costas episodes (season 5) =

This is a list of episodes for Season 5 of Later with Bob Costas, which aired from September 7, 1992, to September 2, 1993.

== Season 5 ==
No.	Original release date	Guest(s)
658	September 7, 1992	Howard Hesseman

No.	Original release date	Guest(s)
659	September 8, 1992	Bob Greene

No.	Original release date	Guest(s)
660	September 9, 1992	John Frankenheimer

No.	Original release date	Guest(s)
661	September 10, 1992	Anthony Quinn

No.	Original release date	Guest(s)
662	September 14, 1992	Dan Rather

No.	Original release date	Guest(s)
663	September 15, 1992	Dennis Miller

No.	Original release date	Guest(s)
664	September 16, 1992	Alan Alda
Part one of a three-part episode.

No.	Original release date	Guest(s)
665	September 17, 1992	Alan Alda
Part two of a three-part episode.

No.	Original release date	Guest(s)
666	September 21, 1992	Camille Paglia
Part one of a two-part episode.

No.	Original release date	Guest(s)
667	September 22, 1992	Camille Paglia
Part two of a two-part episode.

No.	Original release date	Guest(s)
668	September 23, 1992	Don Imus

No.	Original release date	Guest(s)
669	September 24, 1992	Garry Shandling
Part one of a two-part episode.

No.	Original release date	Guest(s)
670	September 28, 1992	Larry King
Part one of a two-part episode.

No.	Original release date	Guest(s)
671	September 29, 1992	Tom Selleck

No.	Original release date	Guest(s)
672	September 30, 1992	Robert Wuhl

No.	Original release date	Guest(s)
673	October 1, 1992	Garry Shandling
Part two of a two-part episode.

No.	Original release date	Guest(s)
674	October 5, 1992	Larry King
Part two of a two-part episode.

No.	Original release date	Guest(s)
675	October 6, 1992	Alexander Haig
Part one of a two-part episode.

No.	Original release date	Guest(s)
676	October 7, 1992	Billy Crystal
Part one of a two-part episode.

No.	Original release date	Guest(s)
677	October 8, 1992	Billy Crystal
Part two of a two-part episode.

No.	Original release date	Guest(s)
678	October 12, 1992	Pete Hamill

No.	Original release date	Guest(s)
679	October 13, 1992	Brandon Tartikoff

No.	Original release date	Guest(s)
680	October 14, 1992	Jimmy Buffett

No.	Original release date	Guest(s)
681	October 15, 1992	Jack Palance

No.	Original release date	Guest(s)
682	October 19, 1992	Michael Kinsley & John H. Sununu

No.	Original release date	Guest(s)
683	October 22, 1992	Mario Cuomo

No.	Original release date	Guest(s)
684	October 26, 1992	Alexander Haig
Part two of a two-part episode.

No.	Original release date	Guest(s)
685	October 27, 1992	Molly Ivins

No.	Original release date	Guest(s)
686	October 28, 1992	Joe Pesci
Part one of a two-part episode.

No.	Original release date	Guest(s)
687	October 29, 1992	Joe Pesci
Part two of a two-part episode.

No.	Original release date	Guest(s)
688	November 2, 1992	David Brinkley
Part one of a two-part episode.

No.	Original release date	Guest(s)
689	November 4, 1992	Kelsey Grammer

No.	Original release date	Guest(s)
690	November 5, 1992	Ron Wood

No.	Original release date	Guest(s)
691	November 9, 1992	Tony Brown

No.	Original release date	Guest(s)
692	November 10, 1992	Lisa Birnbach

No.	Original release date	Guest(s)
693	November 11, 1992	Al Franken

No.	Original release date	Guest(s)
694	November 12, 1992	Jeff Goldblum

No.	Original release date	Guest(s)
695	November 16, 1992	Cokie Roberts
Part one of a two-part episode.

No.	Original release date	Guest(s)
696	November 17, 1992	Catherine O'Hara

No.	Original release date	Guest(s)
697	November 18, 1992	Kirk Douglas
Part one of a two-part episode.

No.	Original release date	Guest(s)
698	November 19, 1992	Kirk Douglas
Part two of a two-part episode.

No.	Original release date	Guest(s)
699	November 23, 1992	Katie Couric

No.	Original release date	Guest(s)
700	November 24, 1992	Jerry Orbach

No.	Original release date	Guest(s)
701	November 25, 1992	Helen Hunt

No.	Original release date	Guest(s)
702	November 26, 1992	Gene Siskel & Roger Ebert
Part one of a two-part episode.

No.	Original release date	Guest(s)
703	November 30, 1992	Gene Siskel & Roger Ebert
Part two of a two-part episode.

No.	Original release date	Guest(s)
704	December 1, 1992	Bob Greene

No.	Original release date	Guest(s)
705	December 2, 1992	Sam Waterston

No.	Original release date	Guest(s)
706	December 7, 1992	Fay Vincent

No.	Original release date	Guest(s)
707	December 8, 1992	Shelley Long

No.	Original release date	Guest(s)
708	December 9, 1992	Steve Allen

No.	Original release date	Guest(s)
709	December 10, 1992	Terry Bradshaw
Part one of a two-part episode.

No.	Original release date	Guest(s)
710	December 14, 1992	Michael Eisner

No.	Original release date	Guest(s)
711	December 15, 1992	William A. Henry III
Part one of a two-part episode.

No.	Original release date	Guest(s)
712	December 16, 1992	William A. Henry III
Part two of a two-part episode.

No.	Original release date	Guest(s)
713	December 17, 1992	Terry Bradshaw
Part two of a two-part episode.

No.	Original release date	Guest(s)
714	December 28, 1992	Pat Cooper

No.	Original release date	Guest(s)
715	December 29, 1992	Jason Alexander

No.	Original release date	Guest(s)
716	December 30, 1992	Danny DeVito

No.	Original release date	Guest(s)
717	December 31, 1992	Richard Jeni

No.	Original release date	Guest(s)
718	January 4, 1993	Mary Fisher

No.	Original release date	Guest(s)
719	January 5, 1993	Clive Davis

No.	Original release date	Guest(s)
720	January 6, 1993	Robert Pastorelli

No.	Original release date	Guest(s)
721	January 7, 1993	Tess Harper

No.	Original release date	Guest(s)
722	January 11, 1993	Wendy Wasserstein

No.	Original release date	Guest(s)
723	January 12, 1993	Don McLean

No.	Original release date	Guest(s)
724	January 14, 1993	Amy Grant

No.	Original release date	Guest(s)
725	January 18, 1993	Cokie Roberts
Part two of a two-part episode.

No.	Original release date	Guest(s)
726	January 19, 1993	Mel Torme

No.	Original release date	Guest(s)
727	January 20, 1993	Alan Alda
Part three of a three-part episode.

No.	Original release date	Guest(s)
728	January 21, 1993	Teri Garr

No.	Original release date	Guest(s)
729	January 25, 1993	David Stern

No.	Original release date	Guest(s)
730	January 26, 1993	Lauren Hutton

No.	Original release date	Guest(s)
731	January 27, 1993	David Brinkley
Part two of a two-part episode.

No.	Original release date	Guest(s)
732	January 28, 1993	Jerry Seinfeld

No.	Original release date	Guest(s)
733	February 1, 1993	Harry Edwards
Part one of a two-part episode.

No.	Original release date	Guest(s)
734	February 2, 1993	Tom Arnold

No.	Original release date	Guest(s)
735	February 3, 1993	Hugh Hefner
Part one of a two-part episode.

No.	Original release date	Guest(s)
736	February 4, 1993	Hugh Hefner
Part two of a two-part episode.

No.	Original release date	Guest(s)
737	February 8, 1993	Richard Belzer

No.	Original release date	Guest(s)
738	February 10, 1993	Carol Burnett
Part one of a two-part episode.

No.	Original release date	Guest(s)
739	February 11, 1993	Carol Burnett
Part two of a two-part episode.

No.	Original release date	Guest(s)
740	February 15, 1993	Randy Newman
Part one of a two-part episode.

No.	Original release date	Guest(s)
741	February 16, 1993	Randy Newman
Part two of a two-part episode.

No.	Original release date	Guest(s)
742	February 17, 1993	Dennis Hopper

No.	Original release date	Guest(s)
743	February 18, 1993	Elizabeth Perkins

No.	Original release date	Guest(s)
744	February 22, 1993	Michael McKean

No.	Original release date	Guest(s)
745	February 23, 1993	Burt Reynolds
Part one of a two-part episode.

No.	Original release date	Guest(s)
746	February 24, 1993	Burt Reynolds
Part two of a two-part episode.

No.	Original release date	Guest(s)
747	February 25, 1993	Martin Mull

No.	Original release date	Guest(s)
748	March 1, 1993	Harry Edwards
Part two of a two-part episode.

No.	Original release date	Guest(s)
749	March 2, 1993	Ben Stiller

No.	Original release date	Guest(s)
750	March 3, 1993	James Coburn
Part one of a two-part episode.

No.	Original release date	Guest(s)
751	March 4, 1993	James Coburn
Part two of a two-part episode.

No.	Original release date	Guest(s)
752	March 8, 1993	Jon Lovitz

No.	Original release date	Guest(s)
753	March 11, 1993	Richard Lewis

No.	Original release date	Guest(s)
754	March 15, 1993	Al Unser Jr.

No.	Original release date	Guest(s)
755	March 16, 1993	Neil Leifer

No.	Original release date	Guest(s)
756	March 17, 1993	Dana Carvey

No.	Original release date	Guest(s)
757	March 18, 1993	John Turturro

No.	Original release date	Guest(s)
758	March 22, 1993	Peter Riegert

No.	Original release date	Guest(s)
759	March 23, 1993	Rosanne Cash

No.	Original release date	Guest(s)
760	March 24, 1993	Jon Bon Jovi
Part one of a two-part episode.

No.	Original release date	Guest(s)
761	March 25, 1993	Jon Bon Jovi
Part two of a two-part episode.

No.	Original release date	Guest(s)
762	March 29, 1993	Sting
Part one of a two-part episode.

No.	Original release date	Guest(s)
763	March 30, 1993	Sting
Part two of a two-part episode.

No.	Original release date	Guest(s)
764	March 31, 1993	Ron Howard
Part one of a three-part episode.

No.	Original release date	Guest(s)
765	April 1, 1993	Ron Howard
Part two of a three-part episode.

No.	Original release date	Guest(s)
766	April 5, 1993	Tom Snyder (guest host); Swoosie Kurtz

No.	Original release date	Guest(s)
767	April 6, 1993	Tom Snyder (guest host); Jay Thomas

No.	Original release date	Guest(s)
768	April 7, 1993	Tom Snyder (guest host); Arthur Hiller

No.	Original release date	Guest(s)
769	April 8, 1993	Tom Snyder (guest host); Tom Skerritt

No.	Original release date	Guest(s)
770	April 12, 1993	Gabriel Byrne

No.	Original release date	Guest(s)
771	April 13, 1993	Darlene Love

No.	Original release date	Guest(s)
772	April 14, 1993	Kathleen Turner
Part one of a two-part episode.

No.	Original release date	Guest(s)
773	April 15, 1993	Kathleen Turner
Part two of a two-part episode.

No.	Original release date	Guest(s)
774	April 19, 1993	Charles Barkley

No.	Original release date	Guest(s)
775	April 26, 1993	Paula Poundstone

No.	Original release date	Guest(s)
776	April 27, 1993	Ice T
Part one of a two-part episode.

No.	Original release date	Guest(s)
777	April 28, 1993	Ice T
Part two of a two-part episode.

No.	Original release date	Guest(s)
778	April 29, 1993	Henry Winkler

No.	Original release date	Guest(s)
779	May 3, 1993	Gary David Goldberg

No.	Original release date	Guest(s)
780	May 4, 1993	Bryan Adams

No.	Original release date	Guest(s)
781	May 5, 1993	Roseanne Barr
Part one of a two-part episode.

No.	Original release date	Guest(s)
782	May 6, 1993	Roseanne Barr
Part two of a two-part episode.

No.	Original release date	Guest(s)
783	May 10, 1993	Martha Coolidge

No.	Original release date	Guest(s)
784	May 11, 1993	Alfre Woodard

No.	Original release date	Guest(s)
785	May 12, 1993	Alan Thicke

No.	Original release date	Guest(s)
786	May 13, 1993	Mario Van Peebles

No.	Original release date	Guest(s)
787	May 17, 1993	Raymond Burr

No.	Original release date	Guest(s)
788	May 18, 1993	Glen Charles, Les Charles & James Burrows
Part one of a two-part episode.

No.	Original release date	Guest(s)
789	May 19, 1993	Glen Charles, Les Charles & James Burrows
Part two of a two-part episode.

No.	Original release date	Guest(s)
790	May 20, 1993	Jerry Van Dyke

No.	Original release date	Guest(s)
791	May 24, 1993	Elizabeth Glaser

No.	Original release date	Guest(s)
792	May 25, 1993	Branford Marsalis

No.	Original release date	Guest(s)
793	May 26, 1993	Carole King

No.	Original release date	Guest(s)
794	May 27, 1993	Laura Dern
Part one of a two-part episode.

No.	Original release date	Guest(s)
795	June 1, 1993	Milton Berle
Part one of a two-part episode.

No.	Original release date	Guest(s)
796	June 2, 1993	Milton Berle
Part two of a two-part episode.

No.	Original release date	Guest(s)
797	June 3, 1993	Laura Dern
Part two of a two-part episode.

No.	Original release date	Guest(s)
798	June 7, 1993	Matt Lauer (guest host); Renny Harlin

No.	Original release date	Guest(s)
799	June 8, 1993	Matt Lauer (guest host); Nathan Lane

No.	Original release date	Guest(s)
800	June 9, 1993	Matt Lauer (guest host); Montel Williams

No.	Original release date	Guest(s)
801	June 10, 1993	Matt Lauer (guest host); Robert Vaughn

No.	Original release date	Guest(s)
802	June 14, 1993	Ted Williams
Part one of a two-part episode.

No.	Original release date	Guest(s)
803	June 15, 1993	Ted Williams
Part two of a two-part episode.

No.	Original release date	Guest(s)
804	June 16, 1993	Eric Stoltz

No.	Original release date	Guest(s)
805	June 17, 1993	Martin Short

No.	Original release date	Guest(s)
806	June 21, 1993	Steve Kroft
Part one of a two-part episode.

No.	Original release date	Guest(s)
807	June 22, 1993	Denis Leary

No.	Original release date	Guest(s)
808	June 23, 1993	Jerry Lewis
Part one of a two-part episode.

No.	Original release date	Guest(s)
809	June 24, 1993	Jerry Lewis
Part two of a two-part episode.

No.	Original release date	Guest(s)
810	July 5, 1993	Jeff Cesario (guest host); Jerry Seinfeld

No.	Original release date	Guest(s)
811	July 6, 1993	Jeff Cesario (guest host); David Sanborn

No.	Original release date	Guest(s)
812	July 7, 1993	Jeff Cesario (guest host); John Mendoza

No.	Original release date	Guest(s)
813	July 8, 1993	Jeff Cesario (guest host); Daniel Stern

No.	Original release date	Guest(s)
814	July 12, 1993	Ossie Davis
Part one of a two-part episode.

No.	Original release date	Guest(s)
815	July 13, 1993	Ossie Davis
Part two of a two-part episode.

No.	Original release date	Guest(s)
816	July 14, 1993	Steve Kroft
Part two of a two-part episode.

No.	Original release date	Guest(s)
817	July 15, 1993	Ron Howard
Part three of a three-part episode.

No.	Original release date	Guest(s)
818	July 19, 1993	Chris Connelly (guest host); Gilbert Gottfried

No.	Original release date	Guest(s)
819	July 20, 1993	Chris Connelly (guest host); Pat Benatar

No.	Original release date	Guest(s)
820	July 21, 1993	Chris Connelly (guest host); George Martin

No.	Original release date	Guest(s)
821	July 22, 1993	Chris Connelly (guest host); Ben Kingsley

No.	Original release date	Guest(s)
822	July 26, 1993	Paul Provenza (guest host); Mo Gaffney

No.	Original release date	Guest(s)
823	July 27, 1993	Paul Provenza (guest host); Anthony LaPaglia

No.	Original release date	Guest(s)
824	July 28, 1993	Paul Provenza (guest host); Bill Irwin

No.	Original release date	Guest(s)
825	July 29, 1993	Paul Provenza (guest host); Blair Underwood

No.	Original release date	Guest(s)
826	August 9, 1993	Mary Matalin

No.	Original release date	Guest(s)
827	August 10, 1993	Richard Schickel

No.	Original release date	Guest(s)
828	August 11, 1993	Bob Greene

No.	Original release date	Guest(s)
829	August 12, 1993	Madeline Kahn

No.	Original release date	Guest(s)
830	August 19, 1993	Paul Shaffer

No.	Original release date	Guest(s)
831	August 30, 1993	Chris Connelly (guest host); Merrill Markoe

No.	Original release date	Guest(s)
832	August 31, 1993	Chris Connelly (guest host); Jim Sheridan

No.	Original release date	Guest(s)
833	September 1, 1993	Chris Connelly (guest host); Petula Clark

No.	Original release date	Guest(s)
834	September 2, 1993	Chris Connelly (guest host); Annabella Sciorra

== Specials ==
No.	Title	Original release date
1	"Five Years Later"	January 30, 1993
Highlights across the show's five seasons on the air.
