= Compass Media Networks =

American radio network

- Type: Private
- Industry: Radio broadcasting, advertising
- Founded: 2009; 17 years ago
- Headquarters: Rye, New York, United States
- Owner: Peter Kosann
- Website: www.compassmedianetworks.com

Compass Media Networks is an American radio network. The company launched in January 2009. It is owned by former Westwood One CEO and former COO of Connoisseur Media, Peter Kosann. The company focuses on radio and offers representation and marketing services for national radio.

== History ==
Founded in 2009, Compass Media Networks is a radio broadcasting company that provides programming, representation, and marketing services for national radio.

== Programming ==
- The Free Beer and Hot Wings Show morning drive time comedy and hot talk program hosted by Gregg "Free Beer" Daniels and Chris "Hot Wings" Michael, along with producers, Steve and Kelly. It is mostly heard on classic rock, alternative rock and active rock stations.
- DeDe In The Morning, DeDe McGuire, syndicated morning urban radio program originating from KKDA-FM in Dallas, Texas and owned by Service Broadcasting.
- The Lars Larson Show. Lars Larson is a conservative political talk show host based at KXL-FM in Portland, Oregon. The show is heard on dozens of affiliates.
- The Market Score Board Report with Ron Insana debuted nationally on May 11, 2009, and offers daily business reports Monday-Friday at the open and close of the stock market.
- Taste of Country Nights hosted by Amber Atnip and Evan Paul, a country music radio show syndicated throughout United States and distributed by Compass Media Networks.
- This Morning, America's First News with Gordon Deal with cohost Jennifer Kushinka and producer Michael Gavin, a four-hour morning news and information program for news-talk radio stations. It airs at 5 a.m. ET weekdays. A recorded one-hour roundup show is heard on Saturday or Sunday mornings on many of the weekday show's affiliates. A podcast version of the show is produced Monday through Saturday.
- Markley, Van Camp and Robbins — Originally co-hosted by Jamie Markley and David van Camp, the show went into national syndication in 2019 from WMBD in Peoria, Illinois. Scott Robbins was later added to the show, with the name of the program being expanded to include him. Airing live between Noon and 3 p.m. ET weekdays, the show would take the place of Rush Limbaugh on many Alpha Media stations following his death in 2021. Many other stations also chose to air the show on tape delay.

=== Acquisition of Westwood One programs ===
After Westwood One was bought out by Dial Global, Compass picked up several of Westwood One's former weekend music programs. Among those were The Beatle Years with Bob Malik, Out of Order with Jed the Fish, and Off the Record with Uncle Joe Benson. After Westwood One reformatted its longtime Saturday-night program Country Gold with a new host (first with Randy Owen, now with Terri Clark), Compass hired the show's previous host, Josh "Rowdy Yates" Holstead, to host a continuation of the previous format under the name The Original Country Gold. Compass also owns the rights to The Deep End with Nick Michaels, which was not previously a Westwood One program.

After Dial Global merged with Cumulus Media Networks, Compass picked up additional programs, including the M. G. Kelly syndicated program library (except American Hit List) and the Rick Dees Weekly Top 40. Big D and Bubba, previously distributed by Premiere Networks, also was added to the Compass lineup; Compass now offers other country dayparts as well, including a midday show hosted by Carsen and Taste of Country Nights evenings.

=== Acquisition of Wall Street Journal This Morning ===
In November 2014, Compass announced the acquisition of The Wall Street Journal This Morning, a morning drive time national news and business program, which had been syndicated by the Wall Street Journal Radio division. The program was renamed This Morning, America's First News with Gordon Deal. The first broadcast under the new title was January 2, 2015.

=== Sports ===
==== National Football League coverage ====
Compass, in conjunction with Dial Global, began broadcasting a slate of Sunday afternoon games from the National Football League beginning in the 2009 NFL season. These broadcasts competed with the NFL on Westwood One and the Sports USA Radio Network. Jason Horowitz is the voice of the Las Vegas Raiders along with analyst Lincoln Kennedy and studio host Tim Cates. Announcers for the Dallas Cowboys broadcast include Danny White, Kevin Ray with in-studio host Jerry Recco. Compass Media Networks NFL broadcast pairings include Chris Carrino with Brian Baldinger. Jon Rothstein serves as studio host. Other play-by-play announcers and analysts include Gregg Daniels. TJ Rives, Tiki Barber, Steve Beurelein, Bill Rosinski, Chad Brown, and Drew Bontadelli.

Compass currently features exclusive broadcast rights for two NFL team broadcasts, the Dallas Cowboys and Las Vegas Raiders. The Raiders signed on to Compass in 2009 and the Cowboys joined fully in 2011. 2009 NFL games were broadcast by individual agreement with eight teams, which featured in all of Compass's games: aside from the Cowboys and Raiders, Compass carried the Atlanta Falcons, Buffalo Bills, Kansas City Chiefs, Philadelphia Eagles, Tampa Bay Buccaneers, and Washington Redskins. The Detroit Lions and Arizona Cardinals were added to the agreement in 2010. An additional four teams added their names to Compass's NFL coverage for the 2011 season- the Chicago Bears, Denver Broncos, San Francisco 49ers, and Seattle Seahawks. By virtue of the teams involved in the two international games, Compass Media Networks held exclusive national broadcast rights to both the NFL International Series and Bills Toronto Series games in 2011. Compass Media expanded their coverage to 60 games a season with the new contracts.

==== NCAA football and basketball coverage ====
Dial Global and Compass announced they would offer a slate of NCAA football games beginning in the 2009 season, competing with ESPN Radio, Sports USA Radio Network, Dial Global, Nevada Sports Network, and Touchdown Radio productions. No specific conference affiliation was announced, and the schedule featured games with teams from the Pac-12 Conference, Western Athletic Conference, Big Ten Conference, Big East Conference, Big 12 Conference, Conference USA, and the Southeastern Conference. In December 2009, Compass Media announced they had gained the national radio broadcasting rights for the Texas Bowl. The Texas Bowl rights lasted only one season as ESPN Radio took over the rights in 2010. By 2012, Compass Media was only broadcasting games from the Big Ten, Big 12, Pac-12, and SEC conferences.

In July 2009, Compass Media announced they would expand their sports coverage to include NCAA basketball, competing with Westwood One. Compass is unable to gain rights to any NCAA Tournament games, however they announced that they signed a contract with the Big Ten Conference to be the exclusive radio provider of the first and second rounds of the Big Ten Tournament in 2010 and all tournament games beginning in 2011.

In 2011, Compass Media Sports increased their coverage of the Big Ten conference by inking a multi-year deal to broadcast the Big Ten Championship game, meaning the Big Ten Basketball Tournament and Big Ten Championship game will be on the same radio affiliates nationwide and at the network's website.

==== Major League baseball coverage ====
In April 2012, Compass announced an agreement with Major League Baseball's Los Angeles Angels of Anaheim to air 25 games out-of-market throughout the team's 2012 season. Chris Carrino and Steve Quis were named as play-by-play announcers for the broadcasts, with Steve Phillips and Darryl Hamilton to serve as analysts. For the 2013 season, Compass acquired rights to select Tampa Bay Rays home games to increase their MLB coverage. Compass has not syndicated MLB games since the 2013 season.

== Former Programs ==
- The Schnitt Show. Todd Schnitt is a conservative talk show host based in Tampa. His show is broadcast live weekdays 3 to 6 p.m. ET from WHNZ and distributed nationwide to an affiliate lineup of nearly two dozen stations.
