= 2004–05 United States network television schedule (late night) =

These are the late night schedules for the four United States broadcast networks that offer programming during this time period, from September 2004 to August 2005. All times are Eastern or Pacific. Affiliates will fill non-network schedule with local, syndicated, or paid programming. Affiliates also have the option to preempt or delay network programming at their discretion.

== Legend ==
- Light blue indicates Local programming.
- Gray indicates encore programming.
- Yellow indicates late night talk or variety shows.
- Gold indicates network news programming.

== Schedule ==
=== Monday-Friday ===
Network		11:00 PM	11:35 PM	12:00 AM	12:30 AM	1:00 AM	1:30 AM	2:00 AM	2:30 AM	3:00 AM	3:30 AM	4:00 AM	4:30 AM	5:00 AM	5:30 AM
ABC		Local Programming	Nightline	Jimmy Kimmel Live!		Local Programming		ABC World News Now						ABC World News This Morning	
CBS	Fall	Local Programming	Late Show with David Letterman		The Late Late Show (12:35)		Local Programming	Up to the Minute						CBS Morning News	
CBS	Winter	Local Programming	Late Show with David Letterman		The Late Late Show with Craig Ferguson (12:35)		Local Programming	Up to the Minute						CBS Morning News	
NBC		Local Programming	The Tonight Show with Jay Leno		Late Night with Conan O'Brien		Last Call with Carson Daly	Local Programming		The Tonight Show with Jay Leno (R)		Local Programming	Early Today	Local Programming	

Note: The Late Late Show featured guest hosts between Kilborn's last episode on August 27, 2004 and Ferguson's first episode as the permanent host on January 3, 2005.

=== Saturday ===
Network	11:00 PM	11:30 PM	12:00 AM	12:30 AM	1:00 AM	1:30 AM	2:00 AM	2:30 AM	3:00 AM	3:30 AM	4:00 AM	4:30 AM	5:00 AM	5:30 AM
NBC	Local Programming	Saturday Night Live			Local Programming									
Fox	MADtv		Local Programming											

== By network ==
=== ABC ===
Returning series

- ABC World News Now
- ABC World News This Morning
- Jimmy Kimmel Live!
- Nightline

=== CBS ===
Returning series

- CBS Morning News
- Late Show with David Letterman
- Up to the Minute

New series

- The Late Late Show
- The Late Late Show with Craig Ferguson

Not returning from 2003-04:

- The Late Late Show with Craig Kilborn

=== Fox ===
Returning series

- MADtv

=== NBC ===
Returning series

- Early Today
- Last Call with Carson Daly
- Late Night with Conan O'Brien
- Saturday Night Live
- The Tonight Show with Jay Leno
