= Nick Michaels =

Canadian-American voice actor, writer, and producer (1950–2018)

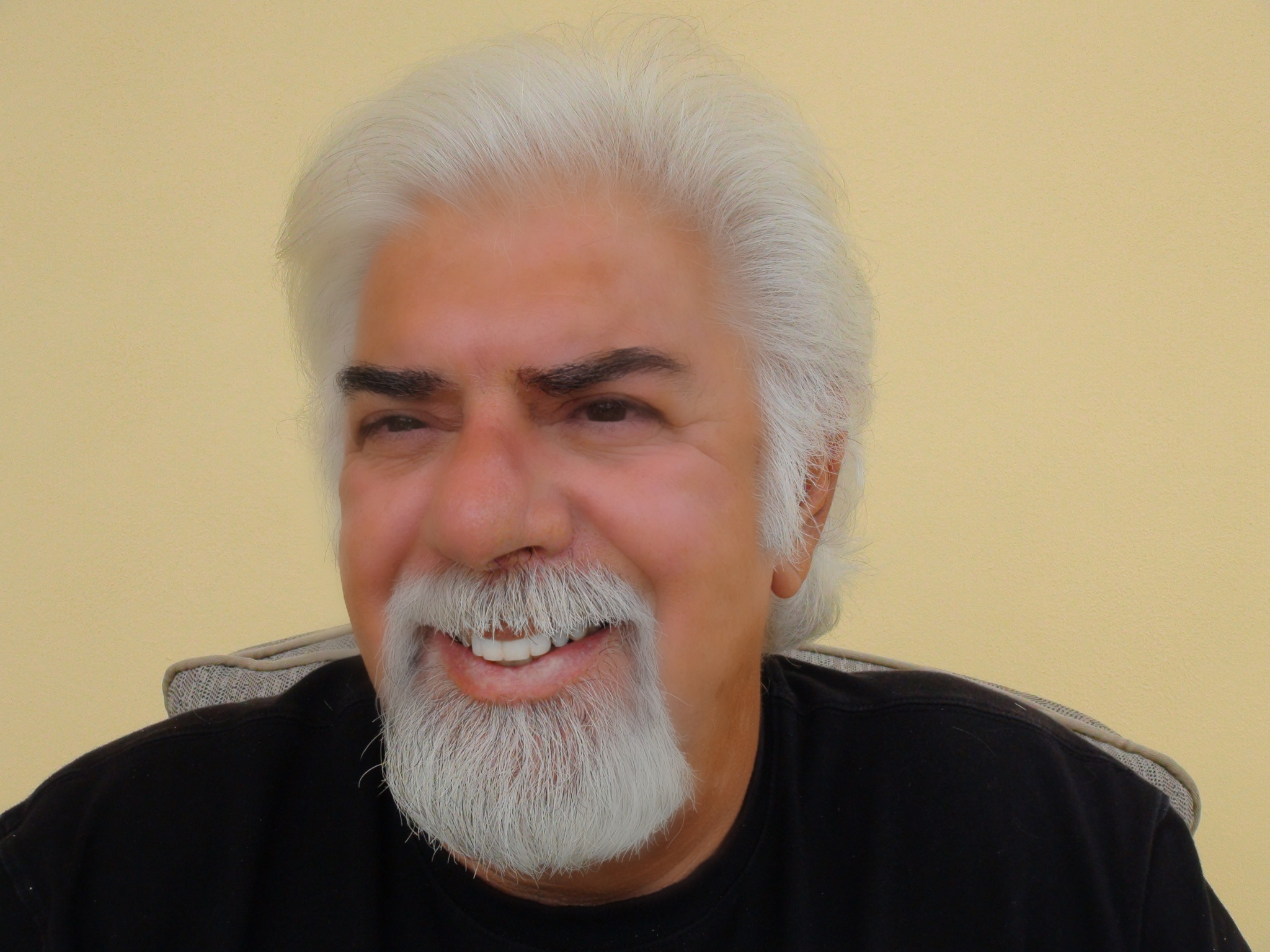
- Born: 1950; Canada
- Died: May 26, 2018 (aged 67–68); Miami, Florida, U.S.
- Occupations: Voice actor, writer, producer
- Years active: 1973–2018

Nick Michaels (1950 – May 26, 2018) was a Canadian-American voice actor, writer and producer.

== Career ==
Nick Michaels started in radio while still in high school in Canada. After copywriting for AdGroup International in Montreal, he moved to Toronto in 1973. He became a commercial voice-over actor.

Michaels relocated to New York City in 1977 and worked with Excedrin, Gillette, Coca-Cola, General Motors, Coppertone, and Maybelline. In all, Michaels' voice has appeared on over a billion dollars of paid advertising. He moved to Miami, Florida in 1980.

In addition to ad campaigns for consumer products, Michaels provided creative services to U.S. media companies. He created the NBC television program Friday Night Videos which debuted in 1983, serving as the original voice-over host until 1986. His voice also was heard on the network's late-night promos throughout the 1980s. In 1992, he became the worldwide voice of topical promotion for CNN. As narrator, Michaels appeared on the series National Geographic Explorer and on the documentary film Barcelona '92: 16 Days of Glory. Michaels also served as the imaging voice for many television stations, including WBBM-TV in Chicago, WCBS-TV in New York City, and WCCO-TV in Minneapolis. In radio, he was the imaging voice for Chicago classic rock radio station WDRV, "97.1 The Drive", since its debut in March 2001.

Michaels established a creative services company, American Voice Corporation, to provide voice imaging and related services to advertisers and radio and television stations. It produces and syndicates his national radio program The Deep End with Nick Michaels and its spinoff, Stories From The Deep End, in the United States and New Zealand. On August 31, 2015, Michaels launched The Stories That Made the Music, a daily one-minute feature series focusing on country music artists, hosted by him and distributed by Envision Networks.

Michaels is the author of the book The Manifesto For The Over Communicated World.

== Death ==
On May 26, 2018, at the age of 67, Michaels died of a heart attack at his home in Miami.

According to the official Facebook page of The Deep End with Nick Michaels, the syndicated radio show will continue to air after Michaels' death until some affiliated stations go off the air.
