= List of Later with Bob Costas episodes =

Later with Bob Costas aired from August 22, 1988, to February 25, 1994.

== Series overview ==
Season	Episodes	Originally aired	
Season	Episodes	First aired	Last aired
1	169	August 22, 1988	August 29, 1989
2	177	September 4, 1989	September 14, 1990
3	163	September 17, 1990	August 29, 1991
4	158	September 9, 1991	August 13, 1992
5	177	September 7, 1992	September 2, 1993
6	75	September 7, 1993	February 25, 1994
