= List of Later with Greg Kinnear episodes =

This is a list of episodes for Later with Greg Kinnear, which aired from February 28, 1994, to October 10, 1996.
