= Rita Sever =

American television hostess and actress (born 1963)

- Born: Rita Marie Sever; November 7, 1963 (age 62); San Francisco, California, United States
- Occupations: Actress, television hostess
- Spouse: Gary Considine

Rita Sever is an American television hostess and actress.

== Life and career ==
Sever was born on November 7, 1963 in San Francisco, California. She is the youngest of seven children.

She is best known as the host of the NBC late-night series Friday Night Videos from 1994 to the show's end in 2000. She also appeared as a guest host on NBC's Later with Greg Kinnear for three episodes.
