= The Deep End with Nick Michaels =

American syndicated radio program hosted by Nick Michaels

The Deep End with Nick Michaels is an American syndicated radio program created and hosted by Nick Michaels. It features a mix of music and stories about the music, representing a wide range of artists and music genres. The show is produced and distributed by American Voice Corporation, a company established by Michaels.

== Availability ==
The program airs four hours weekly. Affiliates may air the program as a single four-hour block, as two shows each two hours long, or as four one-hour shows. As of 2015, the show airs various days and times on radio stations in the United States and New Zealand. Internet audio streams are available via affiliate stations' websites as well as smartphone and tablet apps such as iTunes and Radionomy.

On May 26, 2018, Michaels died of a heart attack at his home in Miami. According to the program's official Facebook page, the program will continue to air indefinitely.
