= Bill Zehme =

American author (1958–2023)

- Born: October 28, 1958
- Died: March 26, 2023 (aged 64)
- Education: Loyola University
- Occupations: Writer, author
- Writing career
- Language: English
- Genres: Journalism, music, popular culture

Bill Zehme (October 28, 1958 – March 26, 2023) was an American author who was known for his writing on music and popular culture. He collaborated on books with such celebrities as Regis Philbin, Jay Leno, and Hugh Hefner. His articles appeared in Rolling Stone, Esquire, Playboy, and Vanity Fair. He won a National Magazine award in 2004 for his profile of newspaper columnist Bob Greene.

== Early life and education ==
Zehme grew up in South Holland, Illinois, attending Thornwood High School and graduating from Loyola University in 1980.

== Work ==
Zehme's first book, written with Bonnie Schiffman, was 1991's The Rolling Stone Book of Comedy. Five years later, Zehme conducted the last major interview of Frank Sinatra’s life, publishing a piece in Esquire's March 1996 issue on Sinatra and the Rat Pack ("And Then There Was One"). This he extended to a full-length book, The Way You Wear Your Hat: Frank Sinatra and the Lost Art of Livin’ (1997).

Zehme's other books include Intimate Strangers, Lost in the Funhouse, and Carson the Magnificent, which was completed posthumously by Zehme's “first-ever research assistant” Mike Thomas and published in 2024.

Zehme's work on the biography of late-night talk show host Johnny Carson began in 2002, when Carson granted Zehme the only interview he granted after he retired, an interview which then appeared in Esquire magazine. A contract with Simon & Schuster originally called for a 2007 release, but Zehme's work continued for years and stopped only after his diagnosis and treatment for a fatal cancer.

Zehme appears alongside Playboy founder Hugh Hefner in a bonus feature interview accompanying the DVD collection Playboy After Dark (2006).

== Selected works ==
(all works by Bill Zehme unless noted)

- The Rolling Stone Book of Comedy... Bonnie Schiffman and Bill Zehme (1991)
- I'm Only One Man... Regis Philbin and Bill Zehme (1995)
- Leading with My Chin... Jay Leno and Bill Zehme (1996)
- The Way You Wear Your Hat: Frank Sinatra and the Lost Art of Livin' (1997)
- Who Wants to Be Me?... Regis Philbin and Bill Zehme (2000)
- Intimate Strangers: Comic Profiles and Indiscretions of the Very Famous (2002)
- Hef's Little Black Book... Hugh Hefner and Bill Zehme (2004)
- Lost in the Funhouse: The Life and Mind of Andy Kaufman (2009)
- Carson the Magnificent with Mike Thomas (2024)
