= Friday Night Videos =

American music video/variety program (1983–2002)

- Graphic from Friday Night Videos intro, used from 1983 to 1990
- Also known as: Friday Night (1994–2000)
- Created by: Dick Ebersol
- Starring: Frankie Crocker; Tom Kenny; Darryl M. Bell; Branford Marsalis; Henry Cho; Rita Sever
- Narrated by: Nick Michaels; Scott Muni
- Country of origin: United States
- Original language: English

Production
- Running time: 90 minutes (1983–1987); 60 minutes (1987–2002)
- Production companies: No Sleep Productions, Ltd. (1983–1989); Fenny's Films (1989–1993); NBC Productions (1989–2000)

Original release
- Network: NBC
- Release: July 29, 1983 – December 29, 2000

Related
- Late Friday

Friday Night Videos is an American music video/variety program that aired from July 29, 1983, to May 24, 2002, on NBC. Originally developed as an attempt by the network to capitalize on the emerging popularity of music videos, which had been brought into the mainstream by MTV during the early 1980s, the program shifted over to a general music focus in 1990, mixing in live music performances alongside the video showcases. Upon being retitled Friday Night in 1994, its format was expanded to incorporate a variety of entertainment content to supplement, and eventually surpass, the music videos. The program ended in 2000, briefly being replaced by a standup showcase show called Late Friday.

== History ==
=== Early years ===
Friday Night Videos was initially produced by Dick Ebersol. From 1974 until 1981, in his role as Director of Late Night Programming at NBC, he co-produced The Midnight Special with that series' creator, Burt Sugarman. Ebersol departed from The Midnight Special in 1981 to take over as the executive producer of his co-creation with Lorne Michaels, Saturday Night Live. Upon doing this, The Midnight Special was canceled and replaced by the Canadian-import sketch comedy program SCTV, which turned out to be a placeholder on NBC's late Friday night/early Saturday morning schedule for a two-year period. SCTV was a quick, cheap solution to an emergency scheduling gap created by Ebersol's urgent departure and was probably not intended to be permanent to start with.

As such, while at SNL—a show that had just gotten back on its feet due to break-out cast members such as Eddie Murphy and Joe Piscopo—Ebersol decided that he would attempt another Friday night music-based program and, instead of simply reviving The Midnight Special, his idea grew into what would become Friday Night Videos, which would replace SCTV in 1983. SCTV ran for one more year on the pay cable channel Cinemax in the U.S. before discontinuing production in 1984.

In its early years, MTV was still a phenomenon that only a minority of Americans actually could see in their homes, as there were many areas not yet serviced by cable television (particularly rural areas and inner-city neighborhoods), and not all cable television providers offered MTV at first. Friday Night Videos took advantage of that fact and proved to be the next best thing for many viewers. While it primarily showcased music videos by popular top 40 acts of the day, unlike its cable rival, Friday Night Videos tended to offer more variety. As such, it featured artists from the genres of pop, rock, R&B, and rap.

In the beginning, like its predecessors The Midnight Special and SCTV, the show ran 90 minutes in length, and consisted of music videos introduced by an off-camera announcer. In addition to this, classic artists of the 1960s and 1970s occasionally appeared in "Hall of Fame Videos", major stars were profiled in "Private Reels", and new clips made their network debuts as "World Premiere Videos".

The most popular feature was "Video Vote". Two videos were played back-to-back, and viewers across the country, with the exception of the West Coast (where the program was seen on tape delay), could call in and vote for one of them, using nationwide 900 numbers for a small per-call fee. The winning video faced a new challenger the following week. When a video won four consecutive video votes, it was declared a "retired champion" and two new videos were introduced the week after, to start over. To increase the number of voters, FNV started to offer free T-shirts every fifteen seconds during the time period when viewers called to register their votes.

Nick Michaels and Scott Muni were the off-camera announcers.

For the show's first few years on the air, the audio portion of the show was presented as a stereo simulcast over FM radio on NBC's owned-and-operated radio stations, along with several affiliates of the NBC Radio Network. This arrangement continued until the launch of television stereo on the NBC Television Network under the MTS standard over a period of two years from fall 1984 until the fall of 1986; it was one of NBC's first programs produced exclusively in stereo.

=== Celebrity hosts ===
Beginning on October 18, 1985, FNV had celebrity guests as the weekly hosts. The first guest hosts were Malcolm-Jamal Warner and Lisa Bonet (who, at the time, were both co-starring on NBC's The Cosby Show). As a result of the host banter, the show often would have to slightly shave off bits of the end of the videos to conserve time. Guest hosts would last through April 5, 1991.

Notable hosts included:

- Sam Kinison, Tommy Lee, and Vince Neil
- Jerry Seinfeld and Steve Landesberg
- Arnold Schwarzenegger and Jay Leno
- Ahmad Rashad and Phylicia Rashad
- Bobby Brown and Malcolm-Jamal Warner
- Darryl M. Bell and Tempestt Bledsoe
- Dave Coulier and Cree Summer
- Bob Saget and George Wallace
- Hulk Hogan and Vince McMahon
- "Mean" Gene Okerlund and Jesse "the Body" Ventura
- Randy Savage and Miss Elizabeth
- Simon Le Bon and Nick Rhodes
- Jason Bateman and Barry Sobel
- Justine Bateman and Michael J. Fox
- Justine Bateman and Jason Bateman
- Kirk Cameron and Alan Thicke
- John Ratzenberger and George Wendt
- Don Johnson and Philip Michael Thomas
- Yoko Ono and Sean Lennon
- Mary Gross and Shelley Long
- Whitney Houston and Pebbles
- Debbie Allen and Kadeem Hardison
- Dawnn Lewis and Bobby McFerrin
- Tiffani Amber Thiessen
- En Vogue and Johnny Gill
- Don King and Mike Tyson
- Matt Crane and Ricky Paull Goldin
- The cast of The Facts of Life
- The cast of Kate & Allie
- Elvira
- The Jets
- George Carlin
- Pee Wee Herman
- Patti LaBelle
- Madonna
- Howie Mandel and Ted Danson
- New Kids on the Block
- Paul Shaffer and Keith Richards
- Ozzy Osbourne
- David Lee Roth
- Dr. Ruth Westheimer
- Stevie Wonder
- Genesis
- Stephen Nichols and Mary Beth Evans
- Julia Duffy and Peter Scolari
- Chris Elliott
- Billy Crystal and Danny DeVito
- Marv Albert and Joe Piscopo
- Stepfanie Kramer and John Stamos
- Teri Garr and Carol Kane
- Mindy Cohn and Kim Fields
- Bob Costas, Ozzie Smith and George Brett

=== Timeslot change and Saturday Morning Videos ===
On June 12, 1987, the show was cut from 90 minutes to an hour, and its starting time was moved back from 12:30 a.m. ET/PT (11:30 p.m. CT/MT) to 1:30/12:30, as a result of the network's decision to add a Friday night (Saturday morning) broadcast of Late Night with David Letterman. The Letterman show, which had previously only aired Monday-Thursday nights (Tuesday-Friday mornings) at 12:30/11:30, had become a major ratings hit by that point.

In early 1990, NBC sporadically ran a Saturday morning edition of FNV for viewers who missed the show hours earlier because of its late-night timeslot. These episodes, however, were usually not repeats of the new episode that just aired the night before, instead tending to be a compilation of past guest hosts. That fall, the network premiered a clone show on the Saturday morning lineup named Saturday Morning Videos, which followed Saved by the Bell and was basically a campier version of FNV that targeted the lead-in teenage audience. It was canceled in 1992.

In late 1990, much like what was occurring gradually on MTV, FNV began to move away from an all-video format. This occurred probably because the novelty of the video fad had begun to wear off and the preferences of FNV's target audience of teens and young adults moved at the same time toward newer, more aggressive genres such as grunge, hardcore rap, and what became indie rock. These were forms that NBC was reluctant to put on FNV broadcasts due to perceived lack of commercial appeal (i.e., except for grunge, little or no radio airplay) and potential obscenity issues in the videos. Regular bumper segments were added instead, featuring various comedians. Those grew to the point that some years later, such material would overtake the final iteration of the program (see below).

In 1991, live in-studio musical performances, again to emulate an MTV trend of the time (e.g., Unplugged), were added. On April 12, Tom Kenny, a then-unknown comedian who would gain fame through voice acting (most notably as the titular character on SpongeBob SquarePants), became the regular on-screen host, joined by longtime New York radio personality Frankie Crocker, who hosted his own feature, "Frankie Crocker's Journal", which highlighted important dates in music history. Crocker later became the host, followed by Darryl M. Bell (then on NBC's A Different World) and eventually Tonight Show band leader Branford Marsalis in 1993.

=== Format change ===
Friday Night's logo

In January 1994, after years of falling ratings and seemingly becoming more and more insignificant in the wake of the cable television boom that allowed more households to have access to MTV, the show was retooled in an attempt to stay relevant.

Beginning with the January 14 broadcast, production of the show moved to NBC Studios in Burbank from New York and the name was shortened to Friday Night. Additionally, it became less of a music video show and more of a general entertainment and variety program, featuring celebrity interviews, stand-up comedy, movie reviews, live performances, viewer polls, and comedy sketches. Subsequently, the show now only made room to air approximately two music videos per episode. The new format also brought two new hosts: comedians Henry Cho and Rita Sever. (Comedian Peter Berman co-hosted three episodes with Rita Sever in 1994.) One particularly memorable episode was the June 17, 1994 broadcast, which aired on the night of the O.J Simpson low-speed chase. Brian Copeland delivered humorous commentary on the news of the week in his segment, "The World According to Copeland". In 1996, Sever took over as sole host. The old Video Vote segment, meanwhile, was brought back and renamed "Friday Night Jukebox."

For the host segments after 1998, Sever would be seated or standing in front of the projection videoscreen on stage left of The Tonight Show with Jay Leno set, near the guest's entrance.

=== The twilight years ===
In 2000, despite having its highest ratings in years, the show was canceled by NBC with its last telecast being December 29, after a seven-year run under that moniker. On January 5, 2001, it was replaced by a new show, a standup showcase called Late Friday. Late Friday continued to air until Last Call with Carson Daly was expanded to five nights a week in May 2002; that show had just begun in January of that year as a Monday-Thursday (Tuesday-Friday mornings) strip at 1:30 a.m. Eastern. NBC opted not to relocate Late Friday and dropped the program after a 19-year run, the last 16 months or so under its final format. The cancellation marked the end of 29 years of NBC scheduling a weekly Friday late-night music or comedy/variety show; since then, the former Friday Night timeslot was later filled with A Little Late with Lilly Singh after Last Call ended in 2019; A Little Late ran until June 2021, at which time NBC gave the former timeslot back to its affiliates.

== See also ==
- List of late night network TV programs
