= Later (talk show) =

Former American late-night talk show

- Original title logo (1989–1994)
- Also known as: Later with Bob Costas (1988–1994); Later with Greg Kinnear (1994–1996); Later with Cynthia Garrett (2000–2001); Later presents SCTV (2001–2002)
- Genre: Late-night talk show
- Created by: Dick Ebersol
- Presented by: Bob Costas (1988–1994); Greg Kinnear (1994–1996); Guest hosts (1996–2000); Cynthia Garrett (2000–2001)
- Theme music composer: Tom Pomposello (1988–1991); Dave Koz & Jeff Koz (1994–2001)
- Country of origin: United States
- Original language: English
- No. of seasons: 13

Production
- Executive producers: Dick Ebersol; Lou Del Prete; Matthew McCarthy; Greg Kinnear; Gary Considine
- Production locations: Studio 8H, NBC Studios, New York City (1989–1994); Studio 5, NBC Studios, Burbank, California (1994–2001)
- Camera setup: Videotape; multi-camera
- Running time: 30 minutes
- Production company: NBC Studios (Note: Credited as National Broadcasting Co., Inc. (1989–1994) and NBC Productions (1994–1996).)

Original release
- Network: NBC
- Release: August 22, 1988 – January 18, 2001

Later is an American late-night talk show that aired on NBC from August 22, 1988 to January 18, 2001. The half-hour program—which aired Monday through Thursday nights (early Tuesday through Friday mornings) at 1:37 a.m. Eastern Time, serving as the lead-out for Late Night with David Letterman until 1993, and Late Night with Conan O'Brien thereafter until 2001—was originally hosted by Bob Costas, who, taking upon a similar format as Tom Snyder’s former NBC late-night show Tomorrow, conducted long-form interviews with a single guest for the entirety of each episode.

The show mostly retained this format after Costas’ departure in 1994; however, when Greg Kinnear succeeded him as host, it began to incorporate more traditional elements typical of the late-night talk format, adding a monologue, comedy bits and occasional musical guests, along with switching from an intimate one-on-one interview style to being taped in front of a studio audience. After Kinnear left Later in 1996 to concentrate on his acting career, the show featured various guest hosts for the next four years until Cynthia Garrett—who became the first African-American woman to host a network late-night show—was named permanent host in 2000.

Following its cancellation in January 2001, Later continued as a showcase of repackaged episodes of the Canadian sketch comedy series SCTV. NBC initially reversed course on its earlier decision to cancel Later in August 2001, announcing that Carson Daly would take over as host; however, the network later chose to instead launch Daly’s program as a new talk show, Last Call with Carson Daly, which premiered in the timeslot on January 8, 2002.

== History ==
=== 1988–1994: Bob Costas ===
To be a good guest on Later, you had to have a body of work. And I pat myself on the back here, but it also goes to the producers and researchers: show business people and athletes stay up at odd hours and they watched the show in disproportionate numbers so a lot of people who didn't do TV back then—and there was still a lot of people who didn't do a lot of TV then—did Later. Paul McCartney did and he hadn't done any US television in 10 years, Robert Duvall who hates interviews did a three-parter, Paul Simon did, as did Carole King who hardly ever does any television and is very shy, Elie Wiesel did, Martin Scorsese did Later and then showed it to his film class at NYU...
Even the athletes we had—Hank Aaron, Kareem, Jim Brown, John Wooden, Mickey Mantle—were people with significant life stories, we didn't go after the hot athletes of the moment...
Of course, there were times when on Monday you'd have a show for the time capsule and then on Tuesday, just because you had to have a show, you had someone who was in a sitcom or had a movie coming out that week. We did well over 600 shows, and I wouldn't want the bottom 100 of them to be re-released, but I think most of them held up pretty well.

— Costas in 2017 on his time hosting Later.

In 1988, NBC decided to again start producing original programming in the 1:30 a.m. Monday through Thursday slot following an almost five-year period—ever since the late fall 1983 cancellation of NBC News Overnight—during which the time slot had been vacant and local affiliates either signed off for the night or programmed the airtime themselves. NBC sportscaster Bob Costas was announced in late February 1988 as the host of a new program set to debut some six months later in August of that year.

By the time he was hired for NBC's new late-night talk show, 36-year-old Costas had been with NBC Sports for almost a decade, most prominently as the studio host of the NFL Live! pre-game show as part of the network's NFL package. He had furthermore been handling play-by-play announcing for the network's baseball telecasts (alongside color commentator Tony Kubek), and occasionally on their NCAA basketball telecasts as well. Only a month after being announced as the host of the upcoming late-night show, he was also appointed to host NBC's late night coverage from the upcoming 1988 Olympics in Seoul, South Korea. Outside of NBC, since November 1986, he had been hosting Costas Coast to Coast, a two-hour, nationally-syndicated Sunday night interview show, reportedly carried weekly by over 150 radio stations, where he got to branch out into longer-form interviews with various athletes. Additionally, since 1983, he had been making regular appearances on NBC's Late Night with David Letterman as part of the show's scripted comedy pieces—mostly as a straight man sportscaster providing live commentary of absurd 'events' thought up by Letterman's writing staff, such as elevator or fire extinguisher races in the RCA Building and search for the Late Night baby. According to Costas, it was in fact Letterman—an admirer of his sports interviews—who had something to do with Costas getting what turned out to be the Later job by suggesting that the sportscaster could do a late night talk show to former NBC executive Dick Ebersol (now heading his own production company No Sleep Productions) who, despite at the moment not formally being a part of NBC's management structure, still had influence within the network owing to many personal and professional contacts including a close friendship with the president of NBC's entertainment division Brandon Tartikoff. Apparently, Letterman—an avid listener of Costas's Sunday night radio show—particularly liked Costas's interview with retired NFL quarterback Bart Starr and told Ebersol that "anyone who can make Bart Starr interesting for two hours deserves to have his own [television] show".

Created and produced by Ebersol, he initially envisioned Later as a nightly reflection on current events in sports and pop culture. However, upon realizing Costas's unwillingness to move to New York City from his family's residence in St. Louis, Ebersol turned it into a stripped-down one-on-one interview show thus eliminating its dependence on current events. Consequently, Later ended up representing something of a break from the typical U.S. late night TV talk show format of the era; featuring Costas and a single guest having an intense conversation for the entire half-hour—without a house band, announcer, opening monologue, studio audience or guest musical performances, close to what Tom Snyder had done on Tomorrow in a similar time slot during the 1970s and would again do on CBS' The Late Late Show in the mid-1990s. Later was taped in New York City at the GE Building's famed Studio 8H, and occasionally in Los Angeles. Costas interviewed a single guest for 45 minutes to an hour in real time before turning the material over to editors, who condensed it down to 22 minutes plus commercials. On several occasions, an interview with a particularly noteworthy guest (examples include Paul McCartney, David Crosby, Bob Seger, Don Rickles, Jerry Lewis, David Letterman, Garry Shandling, Siskel & Ebert, Mel Brooks, Roger Corman, Robert Duvall and Martin Scorsese) was shown over multiple nights. These in-depth discussions won Costas much praise for his interviewing skills. Costas resided in St. Louis throughout his run on Later, flying to New York City once per week to shoot a week's worth of shows, recording all four in a single day. (Later did not air on Fridays as the hour-long music video program Friday Night Videos occupied the time slot following Late Night.)

Debuting on August 7, 1988, guests during the show's first week of episodes were Linda Ellerbee, Gary Coleman and Billy Crystal. An early, generally positive review in Chicago Tribune, though not sure about the need for yet another [nationally broadcast] talk-show, still complimented Costas for coming across as "incontestably genial and dedicatedly sincere" and being "a deft interviewer and a good listener, who knows when to keep quiet, and whose ego doesn't splatter all over the set like Donahue's, Winfrey's, Rivera's, and Downey's". Los Angeles Times television critic Howard Rosenberg—though heaping praise on Costas as one of "the best, smartest and wittiest sportscasters in the business", being "a talk show host in a sportscaster's body", and "an ideal candidate to succeed in any area of broadcasting"—felt that, on Later, Costas needed time to improve due to a poor choice of "uninspired" guests. Only weeks into its run, Later was preempted for NBC's telecast of the 1988 Summer Olympics, with Costas hosting the network's Olympic late-night coverage that aired live on the U.S. West Coast from 9:30 to 11:30 p.m. Pacific Time.

Despite having late-night ratings leaders The Tonight Show Starring Johnny Carson and Late Night with David Letterman as its lead-ins—thus being a part of a 2½-hour programming block that was the biggest money-making group of shows in the entire U.S. television—Later with Bob Costas struggled for ratings individually, rarely clearing one million viewers. Still, with Ebersol's ever-expanding influence on NBC's decision making—now via a formal return to the network's executive management as he was named president of NBC Sports in April 1989, followed by another promotion in July to senior vice president of NBC News in charge of the Today program—both Later and Costas continued receiving ample support, attention, and cross-promotion within the network. With his mentor Ebersol firmly established as one of NBC's top executives, wielding influence in the network's sports, entertainment, and news divisions, Costas also benefited. Adding to his existing duties, he began to substitute host for Bryant Gumbel on the highly-rated Today while, in April 1990, reruns of Later with Bob Costas began airing on NBC's recently-launched cable channel CNBC.

Costas's duties with NBC Sports would expand in 1990. With NBC paying US$600 million over a four-year contract for the American network television broadcast rights to the NBA, beginning with the 1990-91 season, Costas was announced in May 1990 as one of the network's two primary announcers for the upcoming NBA telecasts starting in November 1990. Initially splitting the play-by-play and host assignments during the regular season and playoffs with Marv Albert, Costas eventually convinced NBC Sports president Dick Ebersol to leave the play-by-play duties exclusively to Albert and use Costas solely as the studio host for the NBA Showtime pre-game show (as well as sideline desk host on location during the playoffs).

In August 1990, Later began bringing in guest hosts to occasionally substitute for Costas: Jonathon Brandmeier, Tom Snyder, Pat Sajak, Katie Couric, Linda Ellerbee, Matt Lauer, Chris Connelly, Paul Provenza and Jeff Cesario. Guest host Snyder's March 21, 1991 interview with the 37-year-old New York City-based syndicated morning drive-time shock jock Howard Stern—who came on Later to plug his Crucified by the FCC CD boxset—gained long-term notoriety as the two, though generally remaining within the bounds of civility, nevertheless aggressively and sarcastically expressed dislike for each other by engaging in heated, testy, and uncomfortable exchanges throughout the conversation. Though they met for the first (and last) time face-to-face on this occasion, former NBC late night host Snyder now doing a nightly radio show for ABC Radio and shock jock Stern heard in the New York City, Philadelphia, and D.C. radio markets had had a prior record of mutual attacks on their respective media outlets that continued after their Later confrontation. On October 3, 1991, Later celebrated the third anniversary of its premiere, with an hour-long special airing at 11:30 p.m. Eastern Time, during the time slot normally reserved for The Tonight Show.

Later went on two-month hiatus for the summer of 1992, from late June until early September, in order to accommodate Costas's coveted assignment hosting NBC's primetime coverage of the 1992 Summer Olympics in Barcelona. During December 1992, finishing up his ninth year as host of NBC's NFL coverage, Costas announced he would not be returning as studio host for the telecasts the following season, citing a desire to do something beyond "reading the scores in three minutes during the halftime". In late January 1993, to celebrate its fifth year on the air, Later taped a special anniversary show—5 Years Later—in front of a live audience at the Tonight Show with Jay Leno studio at NBC Studios in Burbank; it aired on the Saturday before that year's Super Bowl, held at the Rose Bowl in Pasadena, with Costas pulling double duty that weekend on Later as well as on NBC Sports' Super Bowl coverage.

During one of his last shows, Costas said personal considerations led to his decision to leave Later. He did not want to move his family to New York and felt worn out by the workload consisting of his obligations with NBC Sports and his duties on Later. Costas' last episode, an hour-long special, aired on Friday, February 25, 1994. In January 2019, after leaving NBC, he expressed interest in reviving Later on another network.

After making a much-publicized switch to CBS, David Letterman (who, until June 1993, had hosted Later's NBC lead-in Late Night with David Letterman) and his production company offered Costas a job hosting the soon-to-launch The Late Late Show, based on his performance and exposure on Later. CBS also offered Costas a correspondent role on 60 Minutes if he accepted Letterman's offer. Costas declined, however, citing his relationship with Ebersol and his desire to remain with NBC Sports. Instead, Tom Snyder would become the inaugural host of The Late Late Show, which began its run in January 1995.

=== 1994–1996: Greg Kinnear ===
In late November 1993, as a consequence of Costas and NBC being in the process of finalizing his new deal that was to be based around sports, NBC named Greg Kinnear (who had been hosting the E!: Entertainment Television comedy clip show Talk Soup since its 1991 debut) as the new host and executive producer of Later, initially set to take over in mid-January 1994. Kinnear's signing with NBC came amid him negotiating with a number of other American television broadcasters, including Fox (that reportedly floated a talk show opportunity in the wake of the quick demise of The Chevy Chase Show), Disney (which discussed potential sitcom and talk-show projects), and CBS (which considered him for the post-Letterman slot). Reportedly competing for the Later job against over two-dozen other candidates—including MTV's Chris Connelly and Rolling Stone's Bill Zehme—Kinnear ended up getting hired without a screen test with NBC additionally throwing possible prime-time specials into the deal. As per the terms of his NBC late-night deal, he was allowed to continue hosting Talk Soup. With Kinnear taking over Later, NBC decided to relocate production of the show from New York City to Los Angeles, reportedly in order to facilitate his continued appearances on Talk Soup. Furthermore, the network's publicly stated plan for Later was to initially keep the format Costas had previously followed—a half-hour interview each night with a single celebrity or public figure—before eventually tailoring the format to Kinnear's talents. A few weeks later, in a December 1993 New York Times interview, Kinnear stated the show would begin incorporating short skits and comedy performances while insisting that one-on-one interviews would remain its backbone.

Originally scheduled for mid-January 1994, Kinnear's debut was subsequently pushed back by a month to February 14. Contrary to the network's earlier pronouncements, the plans for Kinnear's Later to continue as a one-on-one interview show like it had been under Costas were abandoned during preparation for its launch. Instead, it was decided that the program would adopt more of a conventional American late-night talk show format: a studio audience, scripted comedy segments (opening monologue and skits) as well as single guest interview—mostly contemporary TV and movie personalities promoting their projects. Right from the announcement of his stepping into the Later job on NBC, Kinnear was seen by many in the American television industry not only as a successor to Bob Costas but also a potential replacement for the novice performer Conan O'Brien, whose talk show in the preceding 12:35 a.m. Eastern Time slot had been suffering from low ratings and poor reviews ever since it debuted on the network months prior. With news that Kinnear would be doing a conventional late-night talk show, this speculation only intensified.

I came off Talk Soup to go to Later. I had no live audience [experience] at all. I don’t know how the hell I ended up [performing in front of a live audience]. I thought I was gonna do Bob Costas’s show with just two guys talking. And I’m not saying [me doing] that would’ve been good television, but, suddenly, I was walking out and doing a live thing, [telling jokes and going for laughs]. And it was a real adjustment for me, and I wasn’t particularly great at it. I never felt like I got into a comfort zone with it.

— Kinnear in 2019 on his time hosting Later.

Set to begin daily tapings at NBC Studios' Studio 5 in Burbank on Valentine's Day, damage to the building from the 1994 Northridge earthquake resulted in Kinnear's Later debut being postponed by two weeks until February 28, with Seinfeld's Julia Louis-Dreyfus as his first guest. Incidentally on the same night, his NBC lead-in—the struggling Late Night with Conan O'Brien—had the franchise's former host, David Letterman, whose new CBS show had in the meantime become the highest-rated late-night program, on as guest. Following an announcer opening, Kinnear launched into an opening monologue skit called "Media Bites", consisting of video clips followed by sarcastic satirical commentary, delivered similarly to his work on Talk Soup; a feature segment called "Later Letter" followed the interview. Kinnear's guests for the rest of his first week as host were Martin Short, Saturday Night Live's Phil Hartman, and George Carlin.

The initial reviews in the American national press were mostly lukewarm, finding Kinnear adequate but disliking Later's new format. Though observing that—compared to Costas's Later—Kinnear's version is "much, much noisier" and lacks "class and substance", The Washington Post's Tom Shales still found Kinnear to be "fairly adept and extremely self-assured about facing an audience, and making what could pass for witty repartee". Noting Kinnear's snide remarks during the Louis-Dreyfus interview, the critic complained about the scripted gimmicks employed to liven up the conversation, before concluding that the show's biggest problem is the presence of the studio audience. Variety's Todd Everett considered Kinnear's opening monologue to be the most successful of his scripted pieces while finding his interview of Louis-Dreyfus to be full of "overly mundane" questions and "lacking preparation". Though allowing that Kinnear "certainly deserves his shot at the big time" and that his show has "a certain efficient intimacy", Entertainment Weekly television critic Ken Tucker also felt that smirking Kinnear, whom he felt was "constantly on the verge of allowing his raised-eyebrow knowingness to get the best of him", would benefit from examining Tom Snyder's nightly CNBC cable talk show, observing Snyder as "a middle-aged man on television who isn't trying to pass for a 20-year-old hipster" and reducing "the debilitating irony and self-consciousness that cripples so much [of American] pop culture these days".

Generally seen as a more polished on-screen performer than learning-on-the-job O'Brien—and especially with O'Brien in danger of imminent cancellation on several occasions during 1994 as well as being renewed by the network on 13-week intervals—Kinnear was heavily rumored to be likely taking over the struggling 12:35 a.m. show. O'Brien would eventually be kept on.

In addition to his daily duties on Later and Talk Soup, Kinnear pursued acting work in Hollywood. Over three months during the fall of 1994, as part of the casting process for the upcoming remake of Billy Wilder's 1954 romantic comedy-drama Sabrina, Kinnear was summoned for conversations with film director Sydney Pollack and producer Scott Rudin, who had begun considering the 31-year-old television host for the part of a billionaire's playboy son (played by William Holden in the original movie), reportedly solely off Kinnear's television performances on E! and NBC. The part had previously been offered to superstar Tom Cruise, the star of Pollack's 1993 box-office hit The Firm, who turned it down due to a scheduling conflict. Following a screen test in October 1994, Kinnear was offered the part just before Christmas. After signing on to the big-budget motion picture, Kinnear quit Talk Soup as his contract with E! expired in January 1995. For their part, NBC executives decided to accommodate Kinnear by allowing him to be away from the show for months, starting in February 1995, as Kinnear's film role required him to be on location in Glen Cove, New York on Long Island's North Shore. In order to cover for his absence, he taped close to four weeks of original shows before leaving for New York City. The network had Kinnear periodically fly back to Los Angeles to tape more shows in bulk as Later with Greg Kinnear temporarily discontinued the practice of being taped daily. By late May 1995, they resorted to doing a week of reruns, then bringing in Rosie O'Donnell in mid-June to guest host for a week followed by four consecutive weeks of reruns. By mid-July 1995, Kinnear resumed his daily duties on Later.

The remake of Sabrina opened in December 1995 to middling reviews and disappointing box-office results. Still, the favorable exposure led to more movie offers for Kinnear and press speculation as to whether he would leave Later. He took another leave of absence from the show in March 1996 to shoot the comedy film Dear God, directed by Garry Marshall, who offered Kinnear the lead role, having first met him while appearing as a guest on Later. Covering for Kinnear's absence this time, NBC prepared a guest host lineup for six consecutive weeks: Jon Stewart, Alexandra Wentworth, Jay Thomas, David Alan Grier, Peter Tilden, Jeff Cesario, and George Wallace.

Into 1996, Later with Greg Kinnear went through a slight format change; the standard announcer introduction, opening monologue, and the "Later Letter" segment were all dropped to allow more interview time with the guest. In late May 1996, Kinnear was off again, shooting A Smile Like Yours, while NBC lined up a new batch of guest hosts to fill in for him on Later for the entire month—Geraldo Rivera, Eric Tunney, Richard Belzer, Bill Zehme, Jeff Ross, Marc Maron, Al Roker, and Carol Leifer—followed by another six weeks of reruns. In September 1996, after getting cast in As Good As It Gets, Kinnear officially announced his departure from Later. His last episode as host aired on October 10, 1996.

=== 1996–2000: Guest hosts and occasional SCTV reruns ===
After Kinnear's departure, NBC initially continued with the practice of having guest hosts while ostensibly looking for a permanent hosting solution to emerge. More generally, with its lead-ins—The Tonight Show with Jay Leno (which had been the most-watched late night show since the summer of 1995) and Late Night with Conan O'Brien (which averaged 2.6 million viewers with a strong showing among 18-to-49-year-olds)—dominating American late night television and ensuring enough spill-over viewership for Later, NBC reportedly began to treat the 1:35 a.m. show as "a lab" for discovering new talent.

NBC production executive Gary Considine acted as the show's executive producer, assuming the role from Kinnear, who had served as its showrunner during his tenure as host. His wife Rita Sever (then host of the weekly NBC variety show, Friday Night) was the most consistent Later guest host between 1997 and early 1999. Other guest hosts came from just about any facet of public life in the United States, including supermodel Cindy Crawford, actor Matthew Perry, actress/comedienne Lynne Koplitz, actor/comedian/radio personality Jay Thomas, rapper/actor Ice-T, stand-up comic/talk show host Jon Stewart, actress Tasha Smith, stand-up comic/actor Joe Rogan, stand-up comic George Wallace, comedian Tommy Davidson, actor Judd Nelson, actor/comedian Harland Williams, actor/comedian David Alan Grier, comedian Jim Breuer, sports personality Ahmad Rashad, actor Jerry O'Connell, actress Lisa Amsterdam, actor/comedian Michael Rapaport, cable host/VJ Cynthia Garrett, actress/comedienne Lisa Ann Walter, actress Peri Gilpin, actress/model Rebecca Romijn-Stamos, actor/rapper Daryl "Chill" Mitchell, comedienne Paula Poundstone, actor Duane Martin, comedienne Sue Costello and comedian Jeff Ross.

On multiple occasions between late 1998 and July 1999, instead of featuring a guest host or showing a rerun, NBC resorted to airing a package of syndicated reruns of SCTV (which the network had previously aired on Fridays following The Tonight Show from 1981 to 1983, when it was succeeded by Friday Night Videos) as part of Later. The practice was first implemented on December 21, 1998, with a total of 11 episodes of the Canadian sketch comedy series airing for almost three weeks until January 7, 1999. It was then brought back for week-long stints three more times—in March, April, and June–July 1999, respectively.

Several years into the rotating guest hosts strategy, to the extent that it even generated press coverage anymore, Later began to receive criticism over what many saw as creative neglect. Considine—working for NBC's in-house production arm NBC Studios, along with a further advisory role on Leno's Tonight Show, Saturday Night Live and O'Brien's Late Night—was accused of a conflict of interest over his wife Sever's frequent guest hosting stints on Later. Considine defended his position by stating that though he makes hosting recommendations, he is "absolutely not involved in picking the hosts" before offering a claim that in the five weeks Sever hosted Later during the 1998-99 season, ratings were up 15% to 20% among 18-to-49-year-olds and that the final decision on Sever's Later run had fallen to NBC West Coast president Don Ohlmeyer, who left the network in June 1999.

What had become of Later by 1999 was referred to by the New York Post's Austin Smith as a "parade of B-list models, comedians and actors while NBC tries for years to decide what to do with the program". The show's seemingly low prioritization by NBC was even lampooned on-air by the host of its lead-in, Conan O'Brien, who, during a June 1999 Late Night appearance by Later's former host Bob Costas, likened the show's guest host selection process to "jury duty out in L.A." where individuals selected "have to ask not to be made a host". Still, thanks to its strong NBC late-night lead-ins, Later had been posting solid ratings, averaging 1.4 million total viewers and even regularly attracting more coveted 18-to-49-year-olds than The Late Late Show with Craig Kilborn an hour earlier on CBS.

With top management changes at NBC—Garth Ancier replacing Warren Littlefield as president of NBC Entertainment, and Scott Sassa as new NBC West Coast president in Ohlmeyer's place—the network renewed efforts to find a permanent host for Later once the show returned from summer hiatus in September 1999 by initially giving more guest host spots to female comics.

=== 2000–2001: Cynthia Garrett ===
In December 1999, NBC issued a press release announcing former VH1 VJ Cynthia Garrett, who had guest hosted Later twice that month, as its permanent host. The fact that her guest-hosting stints attracted the show's largest audience in nine months in the key adult 18-49 demographic was NBC's main consideration in hiring Garrett on a permanent basis by signing her to a one-year deal. Returning to the show's initial one-on-one interview format but this time with a studio audience, Garrett debuted as the show’s regular host on January 31, 2000, interviewing then-current Oscar nominee for Best Supporting Actor Michael Clarke Duncan, thus becoming the first Black woman in American television history to host her own network late-night show. For the rest of her debut week, Garrett welcomed guests Reba McEntire and Lenny Kravitz, the latter of whom was announced in the press as "Garrett's brother", although it would eventually be revealed the two are not blood relatives but lifelong friends who grew up together in New York City.

Writing about Garrett's debut, based on watching her first three shows, a New York Post reviewer criticized her tendency to "gush over [her] celebrity guests" through excessive use of superlatives to describe them and their work. Comparing Garrett to original host Bob Costas, the reviewer stated an overwhelming preference for Costas, adding that his one-on-one interviewing skill is rarer than one might think. Though admitting Garrett shows hints of the "kind of bubbling personality that plays well on TV", a Chicago Tribune reviewer still disliked her Kravitz interview, finding it sleep-inducing for Garrett nodding along to her "overrated rocker" guest as he "floated off into vague generalities about the afterlife". Assuming that going forward Garrett will be more spontaneous, challenging, and interesting when she's talking to someone with whom she doesn't have a history, the reviewer also recalled Costas's "obvious preparation and research" as something Garrett should aim for.

Over the coming months Garrett would interview guests such as Laurence Fishburne, Joe Montana, Angela Bassett, Leah Remini, Magic Johnson, Tipper Gore, and Tommy Hilfiger. Production of Later remained in Los Angeles from NBC Studios in Burbank, with single mother Garrett spending two days a week taping a week's worth of shows before flying back to New York City to work on VH1 shows and to be with her 7-year-old son.

Averaging 1.3 million viewers since October 2000, the program was canceled in December with the final episode airing on January 18, 2001, just as Garrett's deal with the network expired. Explaining the decision not to renew Later with Cynthia Garrett, NBC Studios president Ted Harbert stated the network "wants to develop a comedy show [in the 1:30 a.m. time slot]" because it sees the time period as a "laboratory to experiment with an idea or a personality that could perhaps find its way to primetime". Garrett became an on-air personality for the TV Guide Channel (eventually succeeding Katie Wagner as host of its daily TV Guide Music News segments) as the then program listings-focused cable channel began interspersing previews and reviews of upcoming TV programs with hosted interstitials. Around this time, NBC entered into negotiations with then-MTV VJ Carson Daly to take over the Later timeslot, though it would take well over a year for a deal to be finalized.

=== 2001–2002: Later presents SCTV ===
Following the end of Later's run, the time slot was once again used to showcase time- and content-edited repeats of SCTV. A new voice-over introduction by Rita Sever presented the program as "Later presents...SCTV", but the series was otherwise identical to the syndicated SCTV repeats that had been airing for years.

On August 15, 2001, as part of a three-year hosting and development deal that he signed with the network, NBC announced that Carson Daly would be the new host of Later. To accommodate his existing duties as host of MTV’s Total Request Live (which broadcast from the cable channel’s Times Square studio at One Astor Plaza), production of Later was to relocate back to New York City’s GE Building at its original home, Studio 8H. However by December of that year, as the new format was being finalized ahead of Daly taking over the time slot the following month, the network—in cooperation with Daly and his new show’s executive producer, David Friedman, who conceived the new title—chose to retire the Later name, wanting to “start something new and fresh”; the show instead premiered on January 8, 2002 as Last Call with Carson Daly, which would run under several formats throughout its 17-year run. The program ended on September 24, 2019, and was replaced by A Little Late with Lilly Singh, hosted by the content creator/comedian; it ran until June 3, 2021, at which point NBC gave the 1:35 a.m. timeslot once occupied by Later back to its affiliates, either to run a rebroadcast of their late-evening local newscasts (a practice that many had earlier discontinued during the late 2000s into the early 2010s) or syndicated programming.

== Nominations and awards ==
During Bob Costas's tenure as host, the show won the 1993 Primetime Emmy Award for Outstanding Informational Series. It was nominated in the same category in 1992, and in the Outstanding Achievement in Graphic Design and Title Sequences category (currently called the Main Title Design category) in 1989.

== In popular culture ==
The opening scene of the 1992 film Unlawful Entry features Bob Costas's Later interview of Chris Evert (from the show's November 7, 1990 episode) playing on a bedroom TV set late at night as Madeleine Stowe's character is asleep and gets woken up by a noise from inside the house.

== See also ==
- List of Later with Bob Costas episodes
- List of Later with Greg Kinnear episodes
- List of late-night American network TV programs
