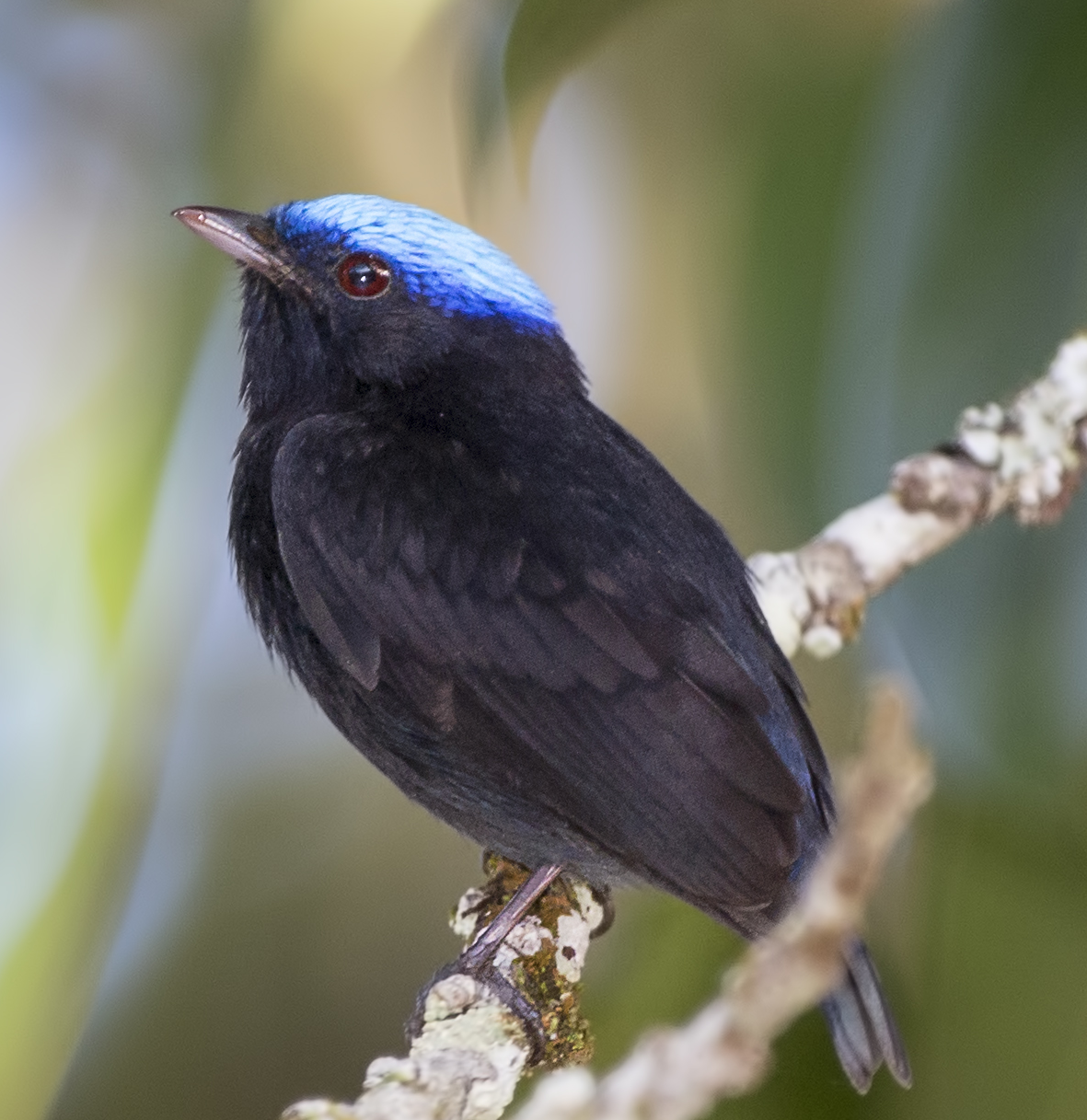
- Adult male photographed in Manacapuru, Brazil

Conservation status
- Least Concern (IUCN 3.1)

Scientific classification
- Kingdom: Animalia
- Phylum: Chordata
- Class: Aves
- Order: Passeriformes
- Family: Pipridae
- Genus: Lepidothrix
- Species: L. coronata

Binomial name
- Lepidothrix coronata (Spix, 1825)

Synonyms
- Pipra coronata Spix, 1825

Audio
- Call recorded in Ecuador

= Blue-capped manakin =

Species of bird

The blue-capped manakin (Lepidothrix coronata) is a species of bird in the family Pipridae. The males have a brilliant blue cap; some have black, others have green body plumage, but the relationship between the subspecies is not well understood.

It is found in Bolivia, Brazil, Colombia, Ecuador, Peru, and Venezuela. Its natural habitats are subtropical or tropical moist lowland forest and heavily degraded former forest.

== Taxonomy ==
The blue-capped manakin was formally described in 1825 by the German naturalist Johann Baptist von Spix under the binomial name Pipra coronata. The type locality is the state of São Paulo de Olivença in western Brazil. The specific epithet is from Latin coronatus meaning "crowned". The blue-capped manakin is now the type species of the genus Lepidothrix that was introduced by the French naturalist Charles Lucien Bonaparte in 1854.

Phylogeny based on Ohlson et al. 2013.

- - - - - - - Ceratopipra
            - Dixiphia
          - Machaeropterus
        - Pipra
      - Manacus
    - Heterocercus
  - - Cryptopipo
    - Lepidothrix
      - - White-fronted manakin
        - Orange-bellied manakin
      - - Blue-crowned manakin
        - - - Snow-capped manakin
            - Opal-crowned manakin
          - - Blue-rumped manakin
            - Cerulean-capped manakin

=== Subspecies ===
Six subspecies are recognised, but see the text below the table.

Subspecies	Description	Range
Lepidothrix coronata coronata (Spix, 1825)	Males typically lack blue coloration and are entirely black.	Eastern Ecuador, and Northeast Peru and Western Brazil south of the Amazon
Lepidothrix coronata caquetae (Meyer de Schauensee, 1953)	Similar in size to L. c. carbonata, but has more black coloration on the male, making the blue markings less distinct. However, it is not as deep black in color as L. c. minuscula.	Southern Columbia, east of Andes
Lepidothrix coronata carbonata (Todd, 1925)		South-central & Southeast Colombia, Southern Venezuela, and Northeast Peru and Northwest Brazil north of the Amazon
Lepidothrix coronata exquisita (Hellmayr, 1905)	Males are typically green much like juveniles and females.	Central Peru east of Andes
Lepidothrix coronata caelestipileata (Goeldi, 1905)		Southeast Peru, Northwest Bolivia and Western Brazil
Lepidothrix coronata regalis (J. Bond & Meyer de Schauensee, 1940)		North Central Bolivia

With the exception of L. c. carbonata, the subspecies categories listed above are not supported phylogenetically. They were instead named based on differences in male plumage. Blue-capped manakins differ genetically into six clades based on geographic location: trans-Andean, Venezuela, North Amazon, Napo-Marañon, Central Peru, and South Peru/Bolivia. Interestingly, birds of highly different plumage fall into the same clades. For example, L. c. exquisita, which has green plumage males, and L. c. coronata, which has completely black colored males, both fall into the Central Peru clade.

Based on significant vocal and phylogenetic differences, in July 2022 the South American Classification Committee of the American Ornithological Society split L. c. velutina and L. c. minuscula from L. coronata and named the resulting L. velutina the velvety manakin. They also renamed the now-reduced L. carbonata "blue-capped manakin" to avoid confusion with the pre-split species. The velvety manakin was therefore promoted to species status and the "blue-crowned manakin" renamed to the blue-capped manakin.

=== Evolution ===
Blue-capped manakins vary genetically based on geographic location. Physical boundaries, such as large Amazonian rivers and the Andes Mountains, tend to separate genetically distinct blue-capped manakins. The uplift of the Andes Mountains seem to be the first major source of separation between blue-capped manakin populations followed by the establishment of Amazonian rivers. The Amazon River separates North and South Amazonian clades and the Napo River separates the North Amazon and Napo-Marañon clades. Large rivers present a barrier to Blue-crowned manakins despite being flighted because they prefer the understory of terra firme (non-flooded) forests. Central Peru and South Peru/Bolivia clades and Venezuela and Amazonia clades are not separated by a geographic barrier. It is likely that they instead historically separated and evolved separately for a period of time.

== Description ==
Blue-capped manakins show sexual dimorphism in weight and wing chord length. Females are heavier at 9.8 g on average with a max weight of 11.5 g and a minimum weight of 8.5 g. Males are 8.5 g on average with a maximum weight of 9.5 g and a minimum weight of 7.5 g. Males have a wing chord length of 60.45 mm on average with a maximum length of 63 mm and a minimum length of 58 mm. Females have a wing chord length of 58.76 mm on average with a maximum length of 62 mm and a minimum length of 55 mm.

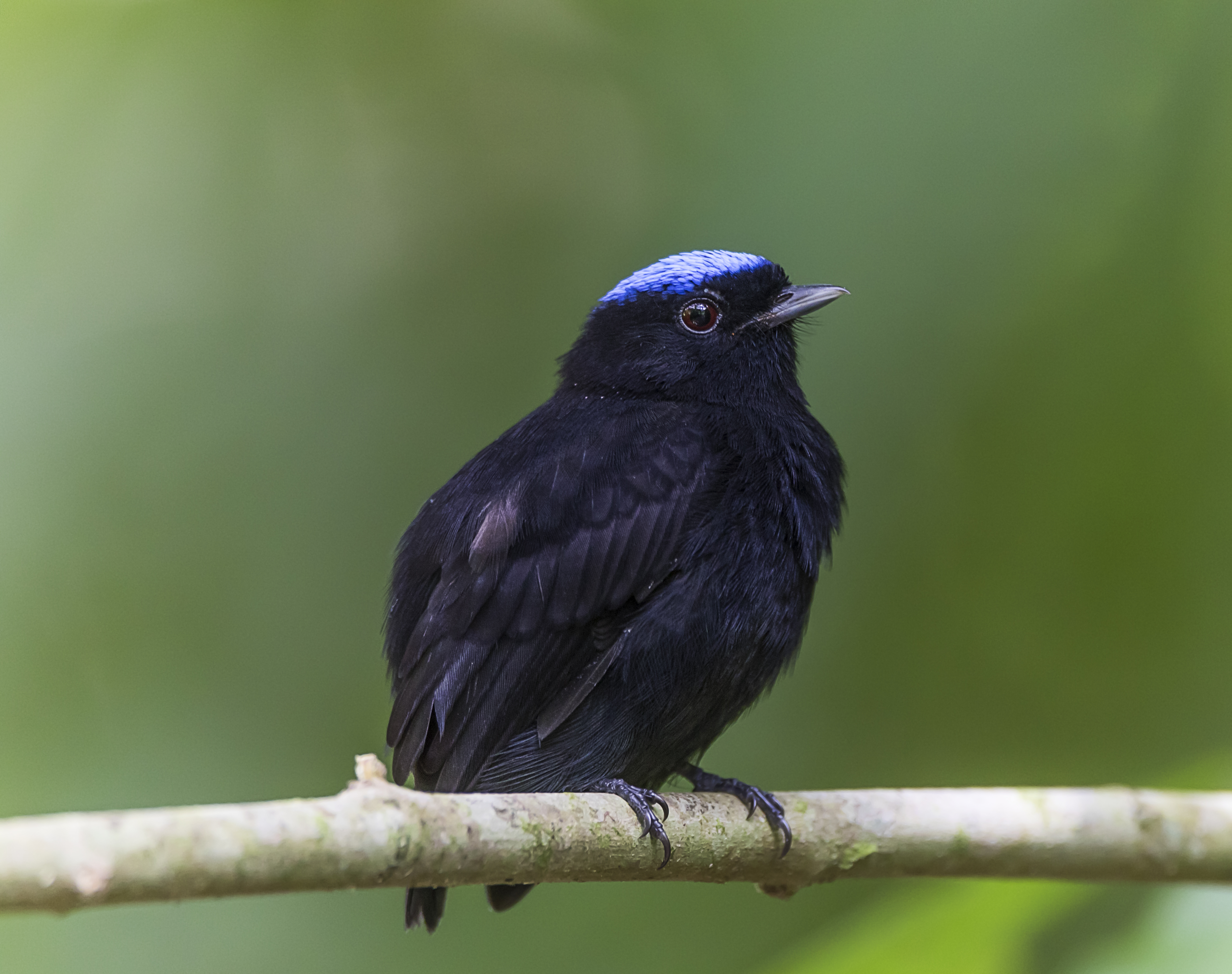
Blue-crowned manakin with male plumage

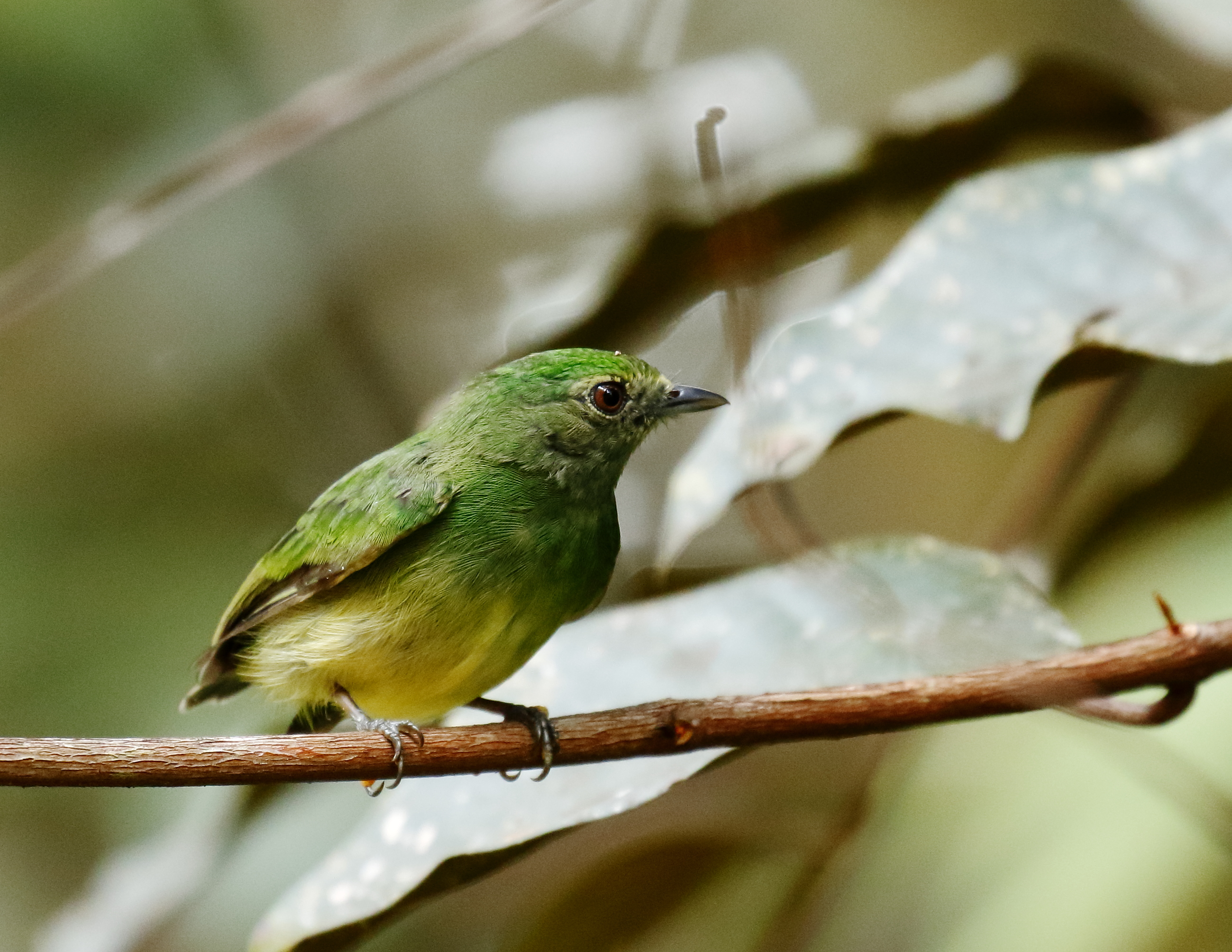
Blue-crowned manakin with female plumage

Male blue-crowned manakin chi-wirr vocalization

Males are sooty black with a bright blue crown while females are green. Juvenile plumage is similar to female plumage but is duller in color. Their first prebasic molt occurs within 2 months of leaving the nest and is a partial molt. Their second prebasic molt occurs at the end of the first breeding season or one year after their first prebasic molt. This molt is complete, so they lose their molt limits. At this stage, males gain signs of male plumage. The third prebasic molt occurs at the end of their third year and males gain full male plumage.

=== Vocalizations ===
The blue-capped manakin's contact call is a swee sound. It is used by blue-capped manakins of all ages and sex. Males will use it while perching on their song perch, while interacting with other blue-crowned manakins, and while performing some of their display behaviors. Females and fledglings use a soft swee sound during foraging. Adult females will also use this call when visiting a territorial male. Their contact call can be a single note or in bouts of a varying number of repetitions. It is a high pitch note that increases in pitch from 2.8 to 5.7 kHz. Territorial males use an advertisement call that sounds like chi-wrr. It can be a single note or 3-5 repetitions. This call is composed of three parts. First, a lower pitched swee sound of 3–5 kHz. Second, a short descending note of three stacked harmonics or 1.4, 2.8, and 4.8 kHz. Third, a harsh note of two harmonics of 2.0 and 3.9 kHz. Males make a preew call when interacting with males and females in their territory. It is composed of 4-5 rapid oscillations between 3.1 and 6 kHz. During display, males make a pee call of 1-10 repetitions. It consists of both flat notes and harmonics between 1.5 and 15 kHz.

== Distribution and habitat ==
Blue-capped manakins live in terra firme forest understory of South America.

== Behavior and ecology ==
=== Breeding ===
Breeding season coincides with the dry season (late November to early April). Males are known to display alone or form leks of up to seven males. Adult and juvenile males form territories though juveniles are unable to maintain their own territory. Their territories range from 206 to 5045 m² in size. They defend their territory and attract mates through song. They perform their songs on song perches that are horizontal or slightly angled twigs and will sing between 6am and 5pm. Their display courts are 3–5 m in diameter and are located close to the ground in the open understory. They use up to two courts at a time, but courts can change location annually. Their courtship displays are somewhat complex with a total of 11 behaviors, 6 of which are aerial. Female's home ranges average 4 ha in size and overlap with one lek on average.

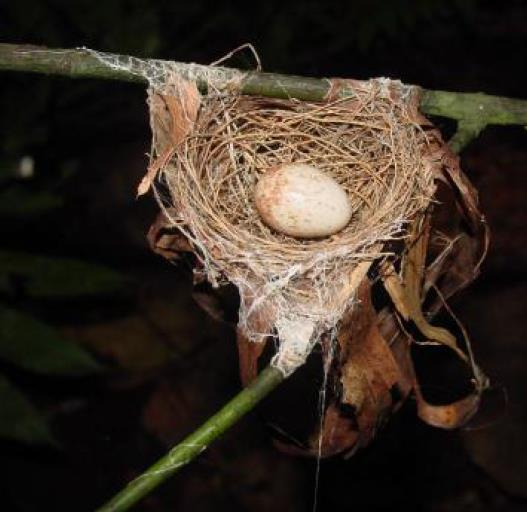
Blue-capped manakin nest placed in a horizontally forked branch with one egg.

Blue-capped manakins make simple, open-cup nests using dry palm, dry leaves, and/or bark externally. The internal lining of their nest is pale brown, but can also be whitish or yellow. They use spider webs to secure their nests to the tree. They chose small shrubs and treelets that are less than 1 meter tall and place their nests on horizontal forks. They typically nest in Rudgea spp., Ixora killipii, R. viridifoliax, and R. lindenicana along small ravines. Females are the sole nest builders and take care of their offspring alone. They lay two eggs per clutch. Their nests experience high predation rates. To help mitigate this risk, Blue-crowned manakins choose nesting sites away from wire-tailed manakins, a species that favors similar nesting environments. This reduces the number of birds nesting in one area and thus reduces the chance that predators will predate the area.

=== Food and feeding ===
Blue-capped manakins are frugivores. Their diet includes fruit from Melastomataceae, Moraceae, Bromeliaceae, and Araceae.

When feeding in a mixed flock, blue-capped manakins tend to flock with cinereus and dusty-throated antshrikes, and the white-flanked, Yasuni, long-winged, gray, and rufous-tailed stipplethroats. These flocks are typically only composed of one or two blue-capped manakins. When there are two blue-capped manakins in a flock, they forage independently from one another. Their behavior is never aggressive toward other species of birds in the flock. Both males and females forage in mixed flocks, but females spend more time on average in the flock. They forage in the understory between a height of 2–7 m. Their preferred food while in flocks are arthropods, including ants, flies, and other small insects. While catching arthropods, their hunting technique was often a sally-strike or sally-glean off of live foliage. Considering their normally frugivorous diet, it is speculated that the blue-capped manakins are taking advantage of the flock's ability to cause insects to scatter.

== Threats ==
Blue-capped manakins experience high nest predation rates with 70% of nests failing due to predation. It is estimated that only 7.5% of nests successfully fledge young. It is uncertain how blue-crowned manakins maintain population size with such a low rate of success, but it has been speculated that high female survivability and multiple breeding attempts per season may be a factor.

Blue-capped manakins can get infected with haemosporidian parasites. A genetic study revealed that half of the sampled manakins were infected with blood parasites, representing nine different types. Young individuals had higher infection rates compared to adults.

== Status ==
The blue-capped manakin has least concern conservation status. A major factor in this decision is its large range of 5,050,000 km^{2} (1,950,000 sq mi). Its population size is unknown, but has a decreasing trend.
