= Paratype =

Specimen that helps define what a taxon represents

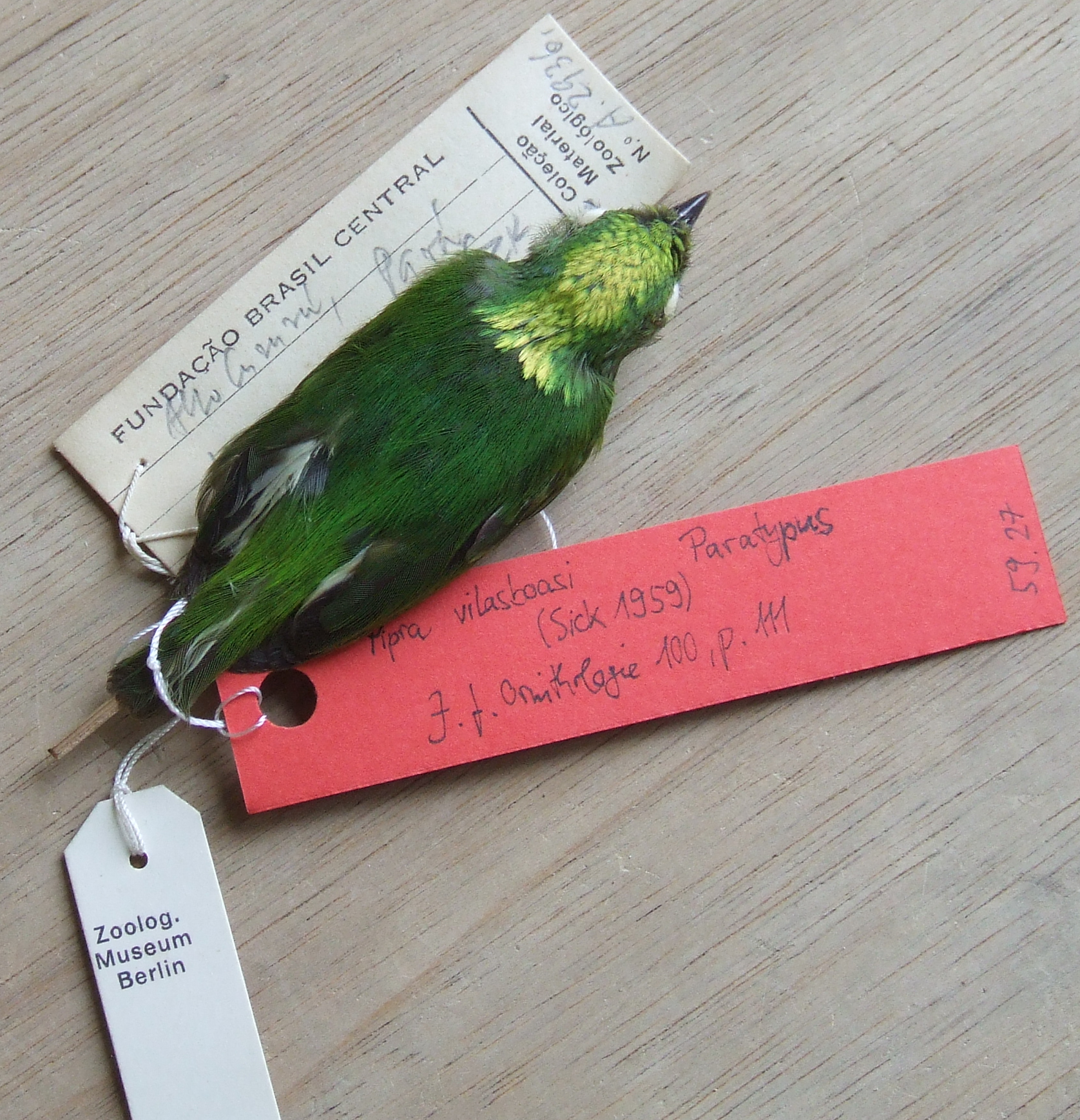
Paratype of Lepidothrix vilasboasi (Sick, 1959) in Museum für Naturkunde, Berlin

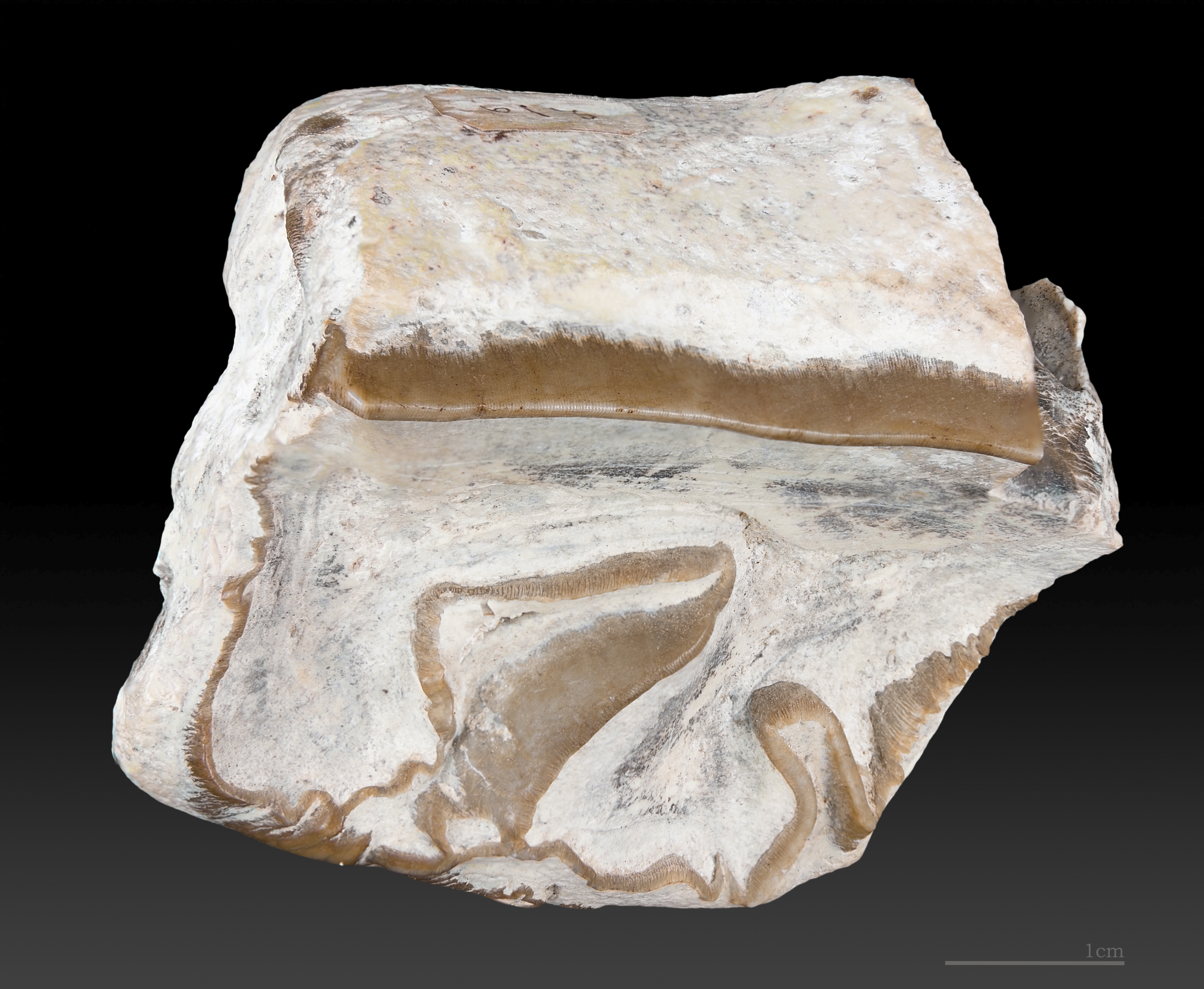
Paratype of Cadurcotherium nouleti – MHNT

In zoology and botany, a paratype is a specimen of an organism that helps define what the scientific name of a species and other taxon actually represents, but it is not the holotype (and in botany is also neither an isotype nor a syntype). Often there is more than one paratype. Paratypes are usually held in museum research collections.

The exact meaning of the term paratype when it is used in zoology is not the same as the meaning when it is used in botany. In both cases however, this term is used in conjunction with holotype.

== Zoology ==
In zoological nomenclature, a paratype is officially defined as "Each specimen of a type series other than the holotype."

In turn, this definition relies on the definition of a "type series". A type series is the material (specimens of organisms) that was cited in the original publication of the new species or subspecies, and was not excluded from being type material by the author (this exclusion can be implicit, e.g., if an author mentions "paratypes" and then subsequently mentions "other material examined", the latter are not included in the type series), nor referred to as a variant, or only dubiously included in the taxon (e.g., a statement such as "I have before me a specimen which agrees in most respects with the remainder of the type series, though it may yet prove to be distinct" would exclude this specimen from the type series).

Thus, in a type series of five specimens, if one is the holotype, the other four will be paratypes.

A paratype may originate from a different locality than the holotype. A paratype cannot become a lectotype, though it is eligible (and often desirable) for designation as a neotype.

The International Code of Zoological Nomenclature (ICZN) has not always required a type specimen, but any species or subspecies newly described after the end of 1999 must have a designated holotype or syntypes.

A related term is allotype, a term that indicates a specimen that exemplifies the opposite sex of the holotype, and is almost without exception designated in the original description, and, accordingly, part of the type series, and thus a paratype; in such cases, it is functionally no different from any other paratype. It has no nomenclatural standing whatsoever, and although the practice of designating an allotype is recognized by the ICZN, it is not a "name-bearing type" and there are no formal rules controlling how one is designated. Apart from species exhibiting strong sexual dimorphism, relatively few authors take the trouble to designate such a specimen. It is not uncommon for an allotype to be a member of an entirely different species from the holotype, because of an incorrect association by the original author.

== Botany ==
In botanical nomenclature, a paratype is a specimen cited in the original description that may not have been said to be a type. It is not the holotype nor an isotype (duplicate of the holotype).

- If no types were specified, then all specimens cited are syntypes.
- If more than one specimen was cited as the type, then they are all syntypes, but specimens cited but not listed as types are paratypes. (Articles 9.5 and 9.6).

Like other types, a paratype may be specified for taxa at the rank of family or below (Article 7).

A paratype may be designated as a lectotype if no holotype, isotype, syntype, or isosyntype (duplicate of a syntype) is extant (Article 9.12).

== See also ==
- Biological type
- Scientific name
- Binomial nomenclature
