= Manikin (disambiguation) =

A manikin (or mannequin) is a life-sized human doll used especially in sales.

Manikin and mannikin may also refer to:

- Transparent Anatomical Manikin, a life-sized human doll used in medical education
- Lonchura, a genus of bird which includes mannikins (not to be confused with manakins)
- Manikin (comics), a Marvel Comics character
- Mannikin (German: Männchen), a type of elf or goblin:
  - The black mannikin of The King of the Golden Mountain
  - Heinzelmännchen, the 'little-Harry mannikin'
- Manikin, an enemy type from the video game, Dissidia Final Fantasy
- Manikin, a human-like race from the video game, Shin Megami Tensei: Nocturne
- "Manikin" (XXXTentacion song)

== See also ==
- Mannequin (disambiguation)
- Manakin, a bird
