= Mannequin Skywalker =

Mannequin Skywalker is an oblique reference to Star Wars fictional character Anakin Skywalker, through substitution of his first name Anakin, with a similar sounding word, mannequin.

Mannequin Skywalker may refer to:

== People ==
- Hayden Christensen, who played Anakin Skywalker in the Star Wars Prequel Trilogy (Episodes II-III), criticized for being a pretty boy with wooden acting, resulting in the nickname "Mannequin Skywalker".
- Jake Lloyd, who played Anakin Skywalker in the Star Wars prequel Episode I The Phantom Menace, allegedly criticized for wooden acting, resulting in the nickname "Mannequin Skywalker".
- Kanye West, a rapper and a fan of Obi-Wan Kenobi, also carries the nickname "Mannequin Skywalker".

== Other uses ==
- Blue Origin Mannequin Skywalker, a test dummy used aboard a Blue Origin New Shepard space capsule (New Shepard 3).

== See also ==
- SpaceX Starman, a test dummy seated in a cherry red generation one Tesla Roadster launched into solar orbit aboard the first Falcon Heavy rocket
- Mannequin (disambiguation)
- Skywalker (disambiguation)
