= Mannequin (disambiguation) =

A mannequin may be:

- a life-sized model of the human or pet figure, such as a dog or cat, used especially in advertising and sales
- a live fashion model.

Mannequin may also refer to:

== Film ==
- Mannequin (1926 film), an American silent film starring Alice Joyce and Dolores Costello
- Mannequin (1933 film), a British drama film directed by George A. Cooper
- Mannequin (1937 film), a drama starring Joan Crawford and Spencer Tracy
- Mannequin (1987 film), a comedy starring Andrew McCarthy and Kim Cattrall
- Mannequin Two: On the Move (1991 film), sequel to the 1987 film, starring Kristy Swanson
- The Mannequin, a 2025 American horror film

== Literature ==
- Mannequin (short story), a 1927 short story by Jean Rhys
- Mannequin, a 1988 novel by Robert Byrne
- Mannequin, a 1994 novel by J. Robert Janes

== Music ==
- "Mannequin", a DVD single by Cradle of Filth
- "Mannequin", a song by Britney Spears from Circus
- "Mannequin", a song by Culture Club from Waking Up with the House on Fire
- "Mannequin", a song by Katy Perry from One of the Boys
- "Mannequin", a song by The Kids from "Fame"
- "Mannequin", a song by The Kovenant from Animatronic
- "Mannequin", a song by Pop Smoke featuring Lil Tjay from Meet the Woo 2
- "Mannequin", a song by Psyopus from Ideas of Reference
- "Mannequin", a song by Wild Strawberries on the album Bet You Think I'm Lonely
- "Mannequin", a song by Wire from Pink Flag

== See also ==
- Manikin (disambiguation)
- Manakin, a family of bird species
