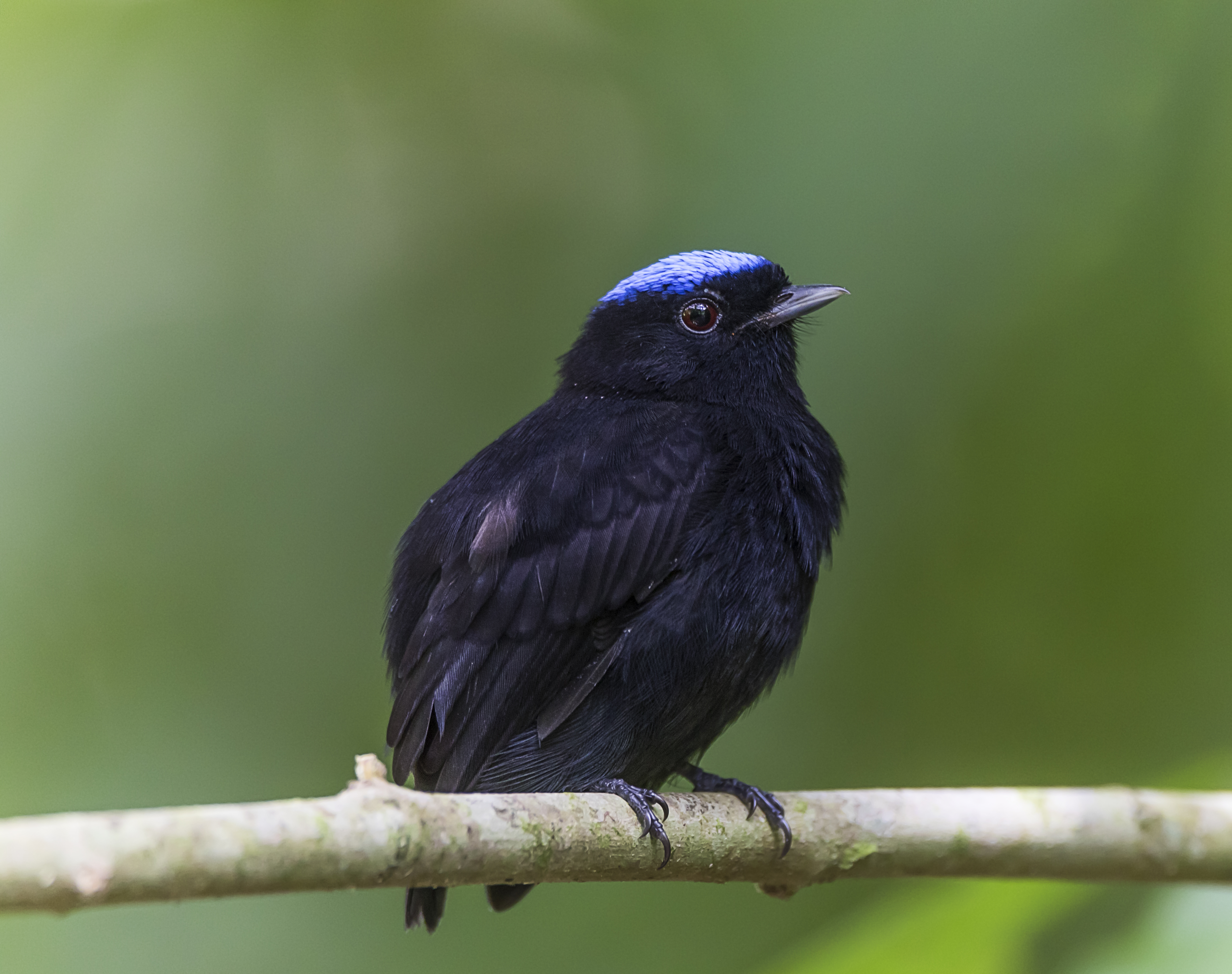

Scientific classification
- Kingdom: Animalia
- Phylum: Chordata
- Class: Aves
- Order: Passeriformes
- Family: Pipridae
- Genus: Lepidothrix
- Species: L. velutina

Binomial name
- Lepidothrix velutina (Berlepsch, 1883)

= Velvety manakin =

Species of bird

The velvety manakin (Lepidothrix velutina) is a species of bird in the family Pipridae. It is native to Costa Rica, Panama and the Chocó–Magdalena region.

== Taxonomy and systematics ==
The velvety manakin has a complicated taxonomic history. It was originally described in 1883 as Pipra velutina. By about 1929 authorities were beginning to treat it as a subspecies of the "blue-crowned manakin" (then Pipra coronata). By the late 1900s genus Lepidothrix was recognized as separate from Pipra and several species including the "blue-crowned manakin" were assigned to it.

A study published in 2022 found that there were significant vocal and phylogenetic differences between taxa west of the Andes those east of the Andes. Based on that study most regional and worldwide taxonomic systems have adopted the velvety manakin as a full species. To avoid confusion, they also renamed L. coronata sensu stricto the blue-capped manakin. However, as of December 2024 BirdLife International's Handbook of the Birds of the World (HBW) retains the taxon as subspecies of the "blue-crowned manakin" L. coronata sensu lato.

The systems that have adopted the velvety manakin as a species and include subspecies in their published lists assign it two subspecies, the nominate L. v. velutina (Berlepsch, 1883) and L. v. minuscula (Todd, 1919).

== Description ==
The velvety manakin is about 8 to 11 cm (3.1 to 4.3 in) long. The species is sexually dimorphic. Adult males of the nominate subspecies have a bright blue crown and upper nape. The rest of their plumage is a "deep and lustrous" black with a purplish-bluish wash on the rump and uppertail coverts. The black becomes somewhat sootier when worn. Adult females have grass-green upperparts whose color is brightest on the rump and uppertail coverts. They have a mostly pale grayish green face and throat. Their breast and flanks are dull green and their belly and undertail coverts olive-grayish with a slight yellowish tinge. Males of subspecies L. v. minuscula have a more ultramarine crown and females slightly deeper green upperparts than the nominate. Both sexes of both subspecies have a bright reddish brown or deep red iris, a bluish gray maxilla, a black or dark gray mandible, and black or dark gray legs and feet with brownish soles.

== Distribution and habitat ==
The velvety manakin has a disjunct distribution. The nominate subspecies is found the Caribbean slope from far southern Limón Province in Costa Rica south through Panama to Veraguas Province. It also is found on the Pacific slope of Costa Rica from about Garabito Canton in central Puntarenas Province and from there south through Panama to Veraguas. Subspecies L. v. minuscula is found from the Canal Zone in Panama east into north-central Colombia to Caldas Department and south through Colombia along the Pacific slope into northwestern Ecuador as far as Manabí Province. The species inhabits humid primary forest and mature secondary forest. In elevation it ranges from sea level to 1,200 m (3,900 ft) on the Caribbean side of Costa Rica and to 1,400 m (4,600 ft) on the Pacific side. It is mostly found below 1,000 m (3,300 ft) elsewhere.

== Behavior ==
=== Movement ===
The velvety manakin is believed to be a sedentary year-round resident.

=== Feeding ===
The velvety manakin feeds mostly on small fruits and also includes insects in its diet. Females and juveniles often join mixed-species feeding flocks. Fruits and insects are grabbed from vegetation with a short upward sally from a perch; insects are also taken in mid-air.

=== Breeding ===
Most data on the velvety manakin's breeding biology come from Costa Rica. There its season spans at least February to June. In Colombia its breeding season apparently spans October to May. Females build the cup nest from plant fibers, leaves, and moss bound with spider web, which also fastens it to a branch. Sometimes a long "tail" of bark strips dangles from the nest. The clutch is two eggs that are dull white to pale gray with brown markings. The incubation period is about 17 to 19 days and fledging occurs 13 to 16 days after hatch. The female alone incubates the clutch and provision nestlings.

=== Vocalization ===
The male velvety manakin's "advertisement" call "a loud k’wek or "chu-WAK" given at a lek. The species' most common call, which both sexes give year-round, is a "soft, clear trill" or a "soft trilled ti’ti’t’t’t’t’t’t’t’t".

== Status ==
The IUCN follows HBW taxonomy and so has not assessed the velvety manakin separately from the "blue-crowned manakin". It is considered locally common in much of its range, uncommon on the Caribbean side of Costa Rica, and common on the Pacific side of the country. It occurs in many protected areas across its range.
