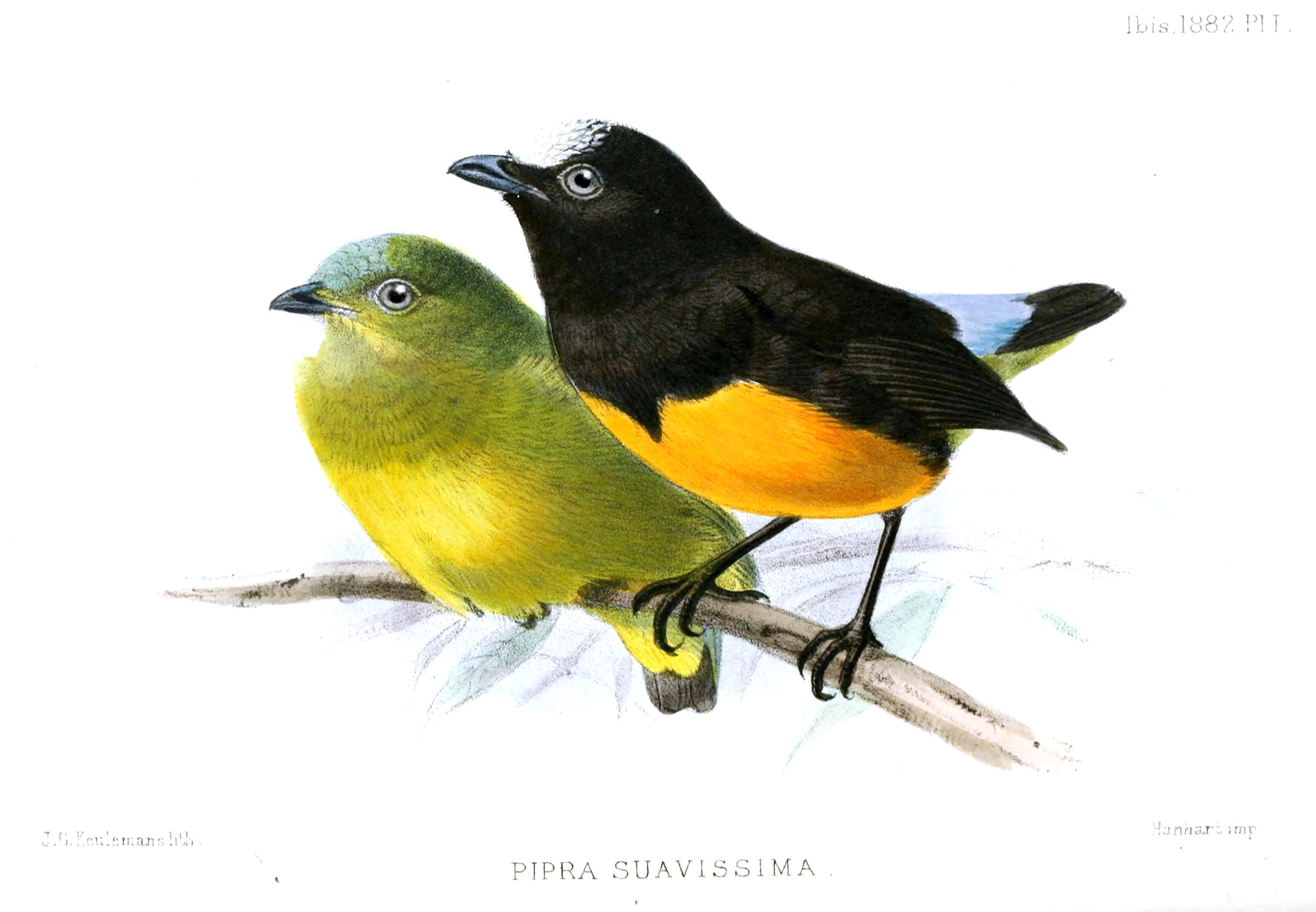

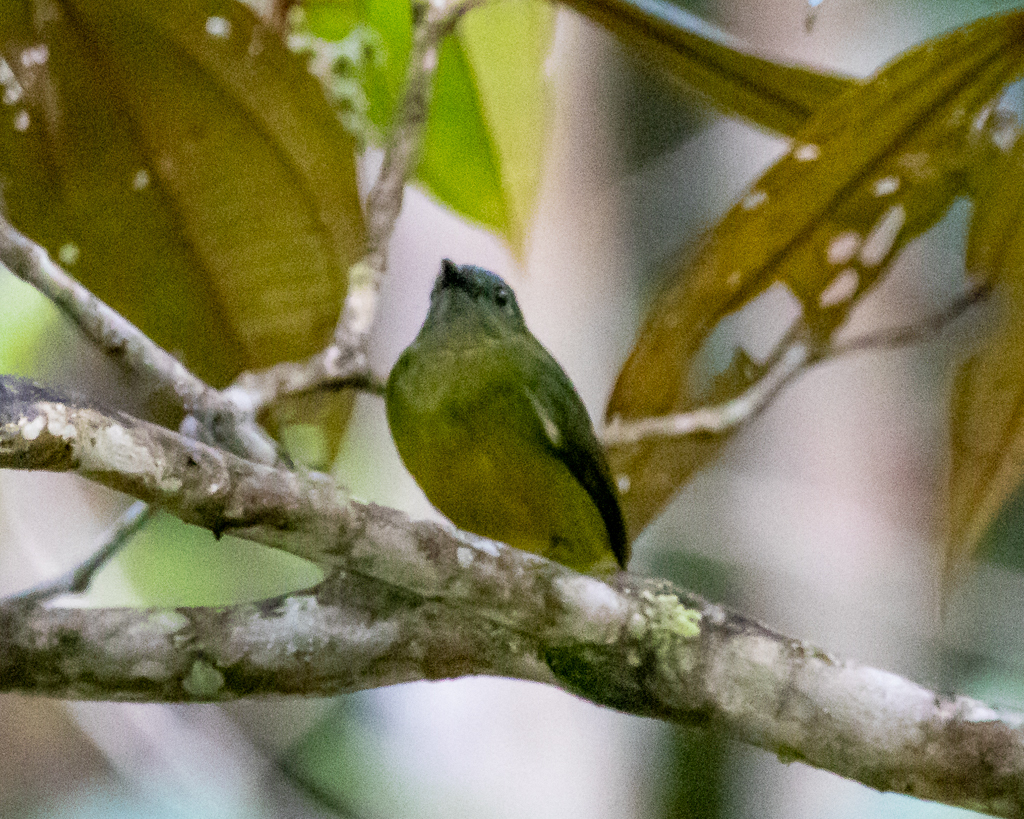
- Female

Conservation status
- Least Concern (IUCN 3.1)

Scientific classification
- Kingdom: Animalia
- Phylum: Chordata
- Class: Aves
- Order: Passeriformes
- Family: Pipridae
- Genus: Lepidothrix
- Species: L. suavissima

Binomial name
- Lepidothrix suavissima (Salvin & Godman, 1882)

Synonyms
- Pipra suavissima Salvin & Godman, 1882

= Orange-bellied manakin =

Species of bird

The orange-bellied manakin (Lepidothrix suavissima), also known as the tepui manakin, is a species of bird in the family Pipridae. It is found in Brazil, Guyana, and Venezuela.

== Taxonomy and systematics ==
The orange-bellied manakin was originally described in 1882 as Pipra suavissima. By the late 1900s genus Lepidothrix was recognized as separate from Pipra and several species including the orange-bellied manakin were assigned to it.

The orange-bellied manakin was for a time in the mid-twentieth century treated as subspecies of the white-fronted manakin (then Pipra serena, now L. serena). The two have very similar plumage.

The orange-bellied manakin is monotypic.

== Description ==
The orange-bellied manakin is about 9 cm (3.5 in) long; one male weighed 8.5 g (0.30 oz). The species is sexually dimorphic. Adult males have a white forecrown, a bright azure-blue lower rump and uppertail coverts, and a yellow-orange belly. The rest of their plumage is black. Adult females have a bluish forehead, a grayish face and throat, and a yellow belly and undertail coverts. The rest of their plumage is green. Both sexes have a dark brown iris, a black bill, and grayish to almost black legs and feet.

== Distribution and habitat ==
The orange-bellied manakin is found at several locations in southeastern Venezuela. It is found mostly in southeastern Bolívar and central Amazonas states; it also occurs locally in northwestern and northeastern Bolívar. From Bolívar its range continues east across extreme northern Brazil and much of central Guyana. It inhabits the interior and edges of humid to wet foothill and montane forest. In eastern and southeastern Venezuela, Brazil, and western Guyana it is found on the lower slopes of tepuis. Further west in Venezuela and east in Guyana it is in more rolling and lower elevation country. In Venezuela it ranges in elevation mostly between 500 and 1,800 m (1,600 and 5,900 ft) with sight records as low as 250 m (800 ft). It also reaches 1,800 m (5,900 ft) in Brazil.

== Behavior ==
=== Movement ===
The orange-bellied manakin is a year-round resident.

=== Feeding ===
The orange-bellied manakin feeds on small fruit and insects. It usually forages singly or in pairs, grabbing its food while briefly hovering after a short flight from a perch. It apparently forages more actively when mixed-species feeding flocks are near but do not join them.

=== Breeding ===
The orange-bellied manakin's breeding season has not been determined. Males display to females, usually singly but sometimes in a large and loose "exploded" lek.

=== Vocalization ===
The male orange-bellied manakin's "advertising" call is "a short, nasal, slightly rising aank" that has been likened to a frog's voice. Other vocalizations include "a rapid warbling or fluttery series...whee-pee-pee-pi-pi-pe-pee", a "quavering wu WE WE wa we we wit", and a "short, slow trill, pr'r'r'r". The last is usually alternated with the aank call.

== Status ==
The IUCN has assessed the snow-capped manakin as being of Least Concern. It has a large range; its population size is not known and is believed to be stable. No immediate threats have been identified. It is considered locally fairly common in much of Venezuela but very local in the lowlands to the west. "Montane forest in much of its range is extensive and mostly difficult of access."
