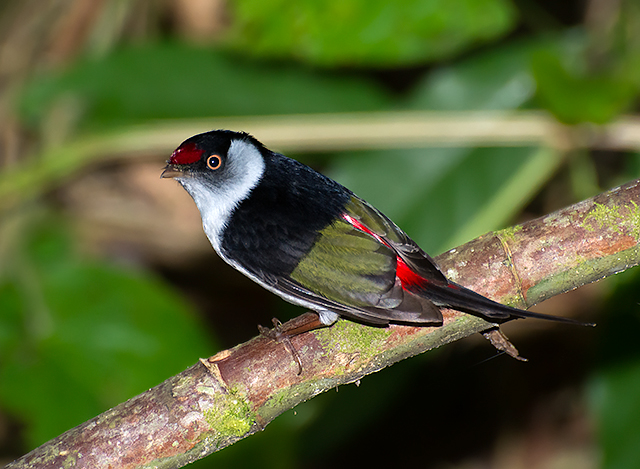

Conservation status
- Least Concern (IUCN 3.1)

Scientific classification
- Kingdom: Animalia
- Phylum: Chordata
- Class: Aves
- Order: Passeriformes
- Family: Pipridae
- Genus: Ilicura; Reichenbach, 1850
- Species: I. militaris

Binomial name
- Ilicura militaris (Shaw, 1809)
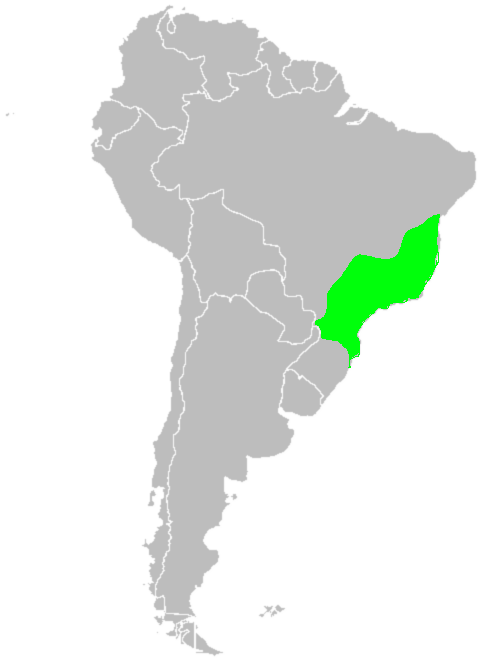
- Range of the pin-tailed manakin shown in green.

= Pin-tailed manakin =

Species of bird

The pin-tailed manakin (Ilicura militaris) is a suboscine species of bird within the manakin family, Pipridae. This species is endemic to the Eastern coast of Brazil within the humid Atlantic Forest, and its range extends from the State of Bahia to the State of Rio Grande Do Sul. The pin-tailed manakin is monotypic within the genus Ilicura, and has no known subspecies. It is a relatively small species that has pronounced sexual dimorphism. Male birds of this species have a bright white neck, chest, auriculars, and flanks. They have black and dark-green wings, with a signature pin shape tail that has a small fork near the tip, helping to give it its common name in English. The males are most easily identified by their characteristically vibrant red fore-crown and rump. The females of this species are a muted green, except for their neck and auriculars—which are light grey, and their cream-colored chest. Both male and female birds of this species share a slightly elongated head shape that gives them a distinguished raised forehead. The pin-tailed manakin's vocalizations are quiet, but resemble a high-pitched "see-see-see" in descending tones.

There has been very little research conducted on this species of manakin, and it especially lacks information on its ecology and breeding habits. The pin-tailed manakin is a primary frugivore, but it has been recorded consuming small amounts of insects on occasion. The diet is relatively unknown, but is hypothesized to be able to transform the keto-carotenoids found within its diet into rhodoxanthin, a rare pigment in animals, that gives this bird its signature red color. The pin-tailed manakin has an elaborate courtship ritual called lekking, and is suspected to breed sometime between November and February. This bird is non-migratory, and its conservation status is currently least concern, but its population numbers are hypothesized to be in decline.

== Taxonomy ==
The pin-tailed manakin is a monotypic species within the genus Ilicura, with no known subspecies. This bird was first named in 1850, without indication of etymology, by a German zoologist named Heinrich Gottlieb Ludwig Reichenbach on in a work titled "Avium Systema Naturale". Its protonym is Pipra militaris. The common name pin-tail manakin in English is based on its tail shape. The first part of its scientific name, Ilicura militaris, stems from the root "ilex" or "ilicis", referring to the botanical species (Ilex aquifolium) of which the tail feathers' pointed central veins resemble the thorns of the leaves, and the Greek root "oura" meaning tail. The second part of the scientific name, militaris, comes from the Latin roots mille, milia, millia, or militaris, referring to thousands or a large quantity. It may also come from the Latin root "militar", giving distinction to the pointed tail's appearance. In Brazil, the common name is Tangarazinho, but is also known as saira-ilicuria, "cracker", and the rainbow tangara in some regions of Santa Catarina. The relationship between the pin-tailed manakin and the rest of its closest relatives within the family Pipridae is relatively unknown, although there is strong correlation between certain aspects of their courtship displays.

== Description ==
Males measure 12.5 cm (4.9 in), while the females measure 11 cm (4.3 in) from tail to beak at full maturity. There is clear sexual dimorphism between mature adults of this species, but can be nearly impossible to identify the sex for certain if they do not have the adult male colorations, as both juvenile males and females resemble each other. All pin-tailed manakins share some common traits: a forking tail at the very end of their rectrices, a slightly elongated forehead, brownish black legs, and bright yellow-orange irises. Adult male pin-tailed manakins have a slightly longer tail, with a very uniquely pigmented red fore-crown and rump, black wings with green secondaries, and a white chest that extends from their under-tail coverts all the way to their auriculars. Females are an olive-green color everywhere except for their grey neck and auriculars, and their crème colored chest extending to its under-tail coverts

=== Vocalizations ===
Vocalizations from this bird are often very quiet, but high-pitched. Their songs sound like "see-see-see" in descending tones, with an average anywhere from 3-8 "see" sounds. Many local birdwatchers are fond of this bird, despite it not being particularly rare, because it is difficult to track in the forest through its songs.

== Distribution and habitat ==
The pin-tailed manakin is endemic to Brazil, specifically inhabiting the Atlantic Forest range from the State of Bahia to the State of Rio Grande Do Sul. Its natural habitats are subtropical or tropical moist lowland forests and subtropical or tropical moist montane forests. They are not very commonly spotted within their range, but spend their time within the lower and middle strata of the rainforests. Their nests are built very similar to a cup, and holds a clutch of 2 to 3 eggs. Their distribution has not been studied in depth, and as a result there is not a firm grasp of where their populations may inhabit. Three pin-tailed manakins have been collected by the Museu Nacional in Rio de Janeiro that has their location of collection tagged as Nova Veneza, which is more inland and Northern than previously recorded, providing evidence for a possible extension of their range.

== Behavior and ecology ==
=== Feeding ===
They feed mostly on small berries, but have been documented eating a few small insects as well. Like most manakins in the family Pipridae, they swallow their food whole. Most feeding observations of this bird have been located on the edges of forests, eating off of small fruit trees and shrubs. The fruits that it has been recorded eating most commonly are of the yellow magnolia (michelia champaca) and the ripe fruits of the chickweed plant (struthanthus polyrhysus). Food is plucked from the air in diving and snatching motions—they do not typically spend time on the plant picking berries to eat.

=== Mating ===
It is believed that the pin-tailed manakin is a solitary species, especially during the breeding season, in which the males create special arenas to display for females. The male pin-tailed manakin creates whirring and snapping noises from its wings during displays in flight. Males will hold an area of approximately 20 to 30 meters across, with a display site called a "lek" and a mating perch in the area. These territories are separate from any other male's territory, but within earshot of one another. The males will "garden" an area they would like to display at, by picking and pulling leaves, debris, and any other vegetation that has grown in the area until the ground is completely clear. They will also clear the space above their mating perch that obstruct the light, presumably to make their feathers appear more vibrant or make room for their display jumps and flights. Unlike any other species of manakin, the pin-tailed manakin's mating perch is not on the ground. The perch is approximately 3.3–20 meters above the ground, and the females are drawn to the male's display site by the male's frequently repeated, "see" calls that descend in volume and pitch throughout the day. Once a female is in the area, the male will draw her to his mating perch and jump back and forth over her, sometimes making a snapping noise in the air, and fluffing out the vibrant red rump with his chin down when he lands facing her. After the snapping sound in the air, it is typically followed by a special "weep" sound. Young males will also visit other male's display sites before they have their definitive plumage to practice their own displays and dances.

== Relationship to humans ==
There is little to no mention of the pin-tailed manakin in culture or relationship to humans.

== Status ==
The pin-tailed manakin is not globally threatened, but is uncommon to fairly uncommon within the Atlantic Forest range of Brazil. According to the IUCN, the pin-tailed manakin is rated as Least Concern with an unknown quantity of individuals, suspected to be in decline from habitat destruction, but needs more research conducted to provide an accurate conservational account.

== Other ==
The pin-tailed manakin's characteristically red fore-crown and rump come from the carotenoid pigment rhodoxanthin. Rhodoxanthin is a uniquely rare red pigment amongst most animals, as it is created endogenously from the organism itself. Rhodoxanthin is a carotenoid hypothesized to be created from the 4 keto-carotenoids that are found in the diet of the pin-tailed manakin, and then transformed into stereoisomers of rhodoxanthin to be used as pigmentation in the feathers through some unknown process. Rhodoxanthin is unique because it can produce a wide range of reds and yellows due to its ability to reflect and absorb light from longer wavelengths—which most other pigments are incapable of.

One mutant has been found of the pin-tailed manakin species in which the normally red fore-crown and rump were replaced with an orange and yellow color. This mutant is hypothesized to have a mutation that does not allow for the 4 keto-carotenoids to be transformed into rhodoxanthin, or for the production of its stereoisomers. Research on rhodoxanthin in pin-tailed manakins has revealed much about its pigmentary capabilities, but more research is still needed to identify the biological processes that lead to the phenotypic red color in these bird's feathers.
