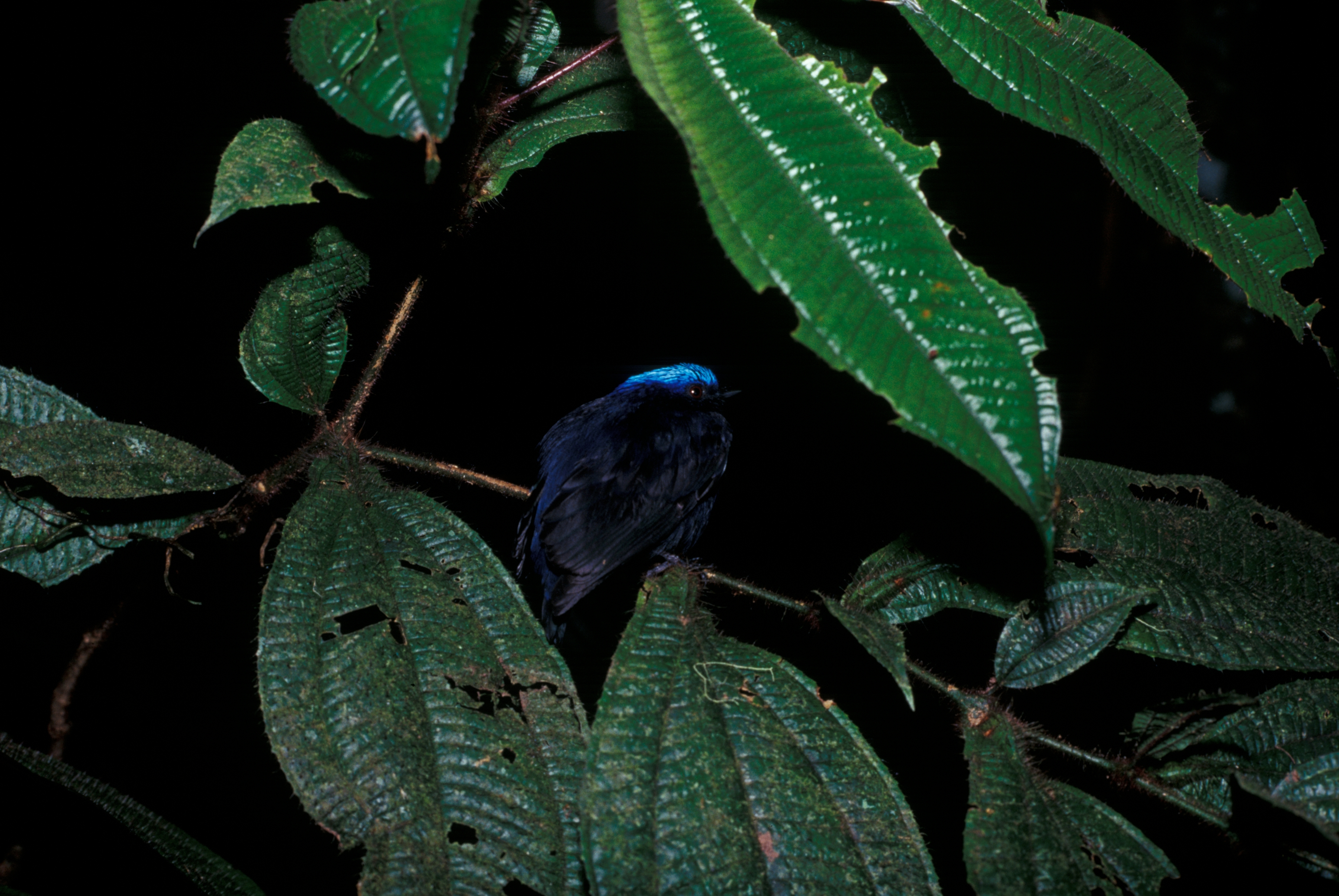
- Velvety manakin

Scientific classification
- Kingdom: Animalia
- Phylum: Chordata
- Class: Aves
- Order: Passeriformes
- Family: Pipridae
- Genus: Lepidothrix; Bonaparte, 1854

Type species
- Pipra cyanocapilla = Lepidothrix coronata Hahn, 1826

Synonyms
- Neolepidothrix Paclt, 2009

= Lepidothrix =

Genus of birds

Lepidothrix is a genus of passerine birds in the manakin family Pipridae. Birds in the genus are predominantly found in South America, but one species, the velvety manakin, also ranges into Central America. Females have green plumage with yellow bellies, as do some males. Other males have black plumage with white or blue crowns, and some have yellow bellies or blue rumps.

== Taxonomy ==
The genus Lepidothrix was introduced by the French naturalist Charles Lucien Bonaparte in 1854. The type species was subsequently designated as the blue-capped manakin. The name Lepidothrix combines the Ancient Greek words λεπις lepis, λεπιδος lepidos "scale, flake" and θριξ thrix, τριχος trikhos "hair". A new genus name Neolepidothrix, was proposed in 2009 due to a suggestion that it was a junior homonym of the extinct silverfish Lepidotrix, however it was later shown that the original spelling of the silverfish genus was not same, so therefore the genera were not homonymous.

The genus contains nine species:

Image	Scientific name	Common name	Distribution
	Lepidothrix velutina	Velvety manakin	Colombia, Costa Rica, Ecuador, and Panama
	Lepidothrix coronata	Blue-capped manakin	Bolivia, Brazil, Colombia, Ecuador, Peru, and Venezuela
	Lepidothrix suavissima	Orange-bellied manakin	southern Venezuela, far northern Brazil, and central Guyana
	Lepidothrix serena	White-fronted manakin	Surname and French Guiana
	Lepidothrix iris	Opal-crowned manakin	Brazil
	Lepidothrix vilasboasi	Golden-crowned manakin	Brazil
	Lepidothrix nattereri	Snow-capped manakin	Amazon Basin of Brazil and far north-eastern Bolivia
	Lepidothrix isidorei	Blue-rumped manakin	Colombia, Ecuador, and Peru
	Lepidothrix coeruleocapilla	Cerulean-capped manakin	Peru
