= Skywalker (disambiguation) =

The Skywalker family is a fictional family in the Star Wars series, specifically the nine-part Skywalker saga.

Skywalker or Sky Walker may also refer to:

== Aircraft ==
- Bilsam Sky Walker, a single-seat Polish paramotor
- Bilsam Sky Walker I, a single-seat Polish powered parachute
- Bilsam Sky Walker II, a two-seat Polish powered parachute

== George Lucas-related properties ==
- Skywalker Ranch, in Marin County, California, US
- Skywalker Sound, a division of George Lucas' Lucas Digital motion picture group

== People ==
- Luke Skyywalker (born 1960), former stage name of Luther Campbell, American rapper
- David Thompson (basketball) (born 1954), American basketball player, nicknamed "Skywalker"
- Kenny "Sky" Walker (born 1964), American basketball player
- Skywalker Nitron (born 1966), ring name of Tyler Mane, Canadian wrestler
- Skywalkers, Mohawk iron- and steelworkers

== Music ==
- Luke Skyywalker Records or Luke Records, American record label
- "Sky Walker" (song), a 2017 song by Miguel
- "Sky Walker", a song by Kelly Rowland from Talk a Good Game, 2013

== Others ==
- Skywalker (horse) (1982–2003), American racehorse
- Cheonan Hyundai Capital Skywalkers, South Korean professional volleyball team
- The Sky Walker, 1939 pulp magazine story by Paul Ernst
- SpaceX Skywalker, a spacewalk EVA module that attaches to the SpaceX Dragon 2
- Skywalkers: A Love Story, a 2024 Netflix documentary film

== See also ==
- Mannequin Skywalker, a nickname
- Sky (disambiguation)
- Walker (disambiguation)
