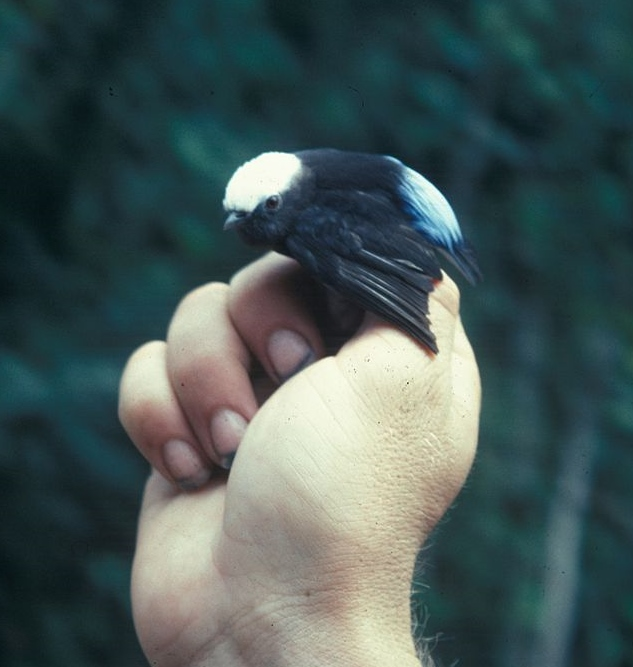
- Male
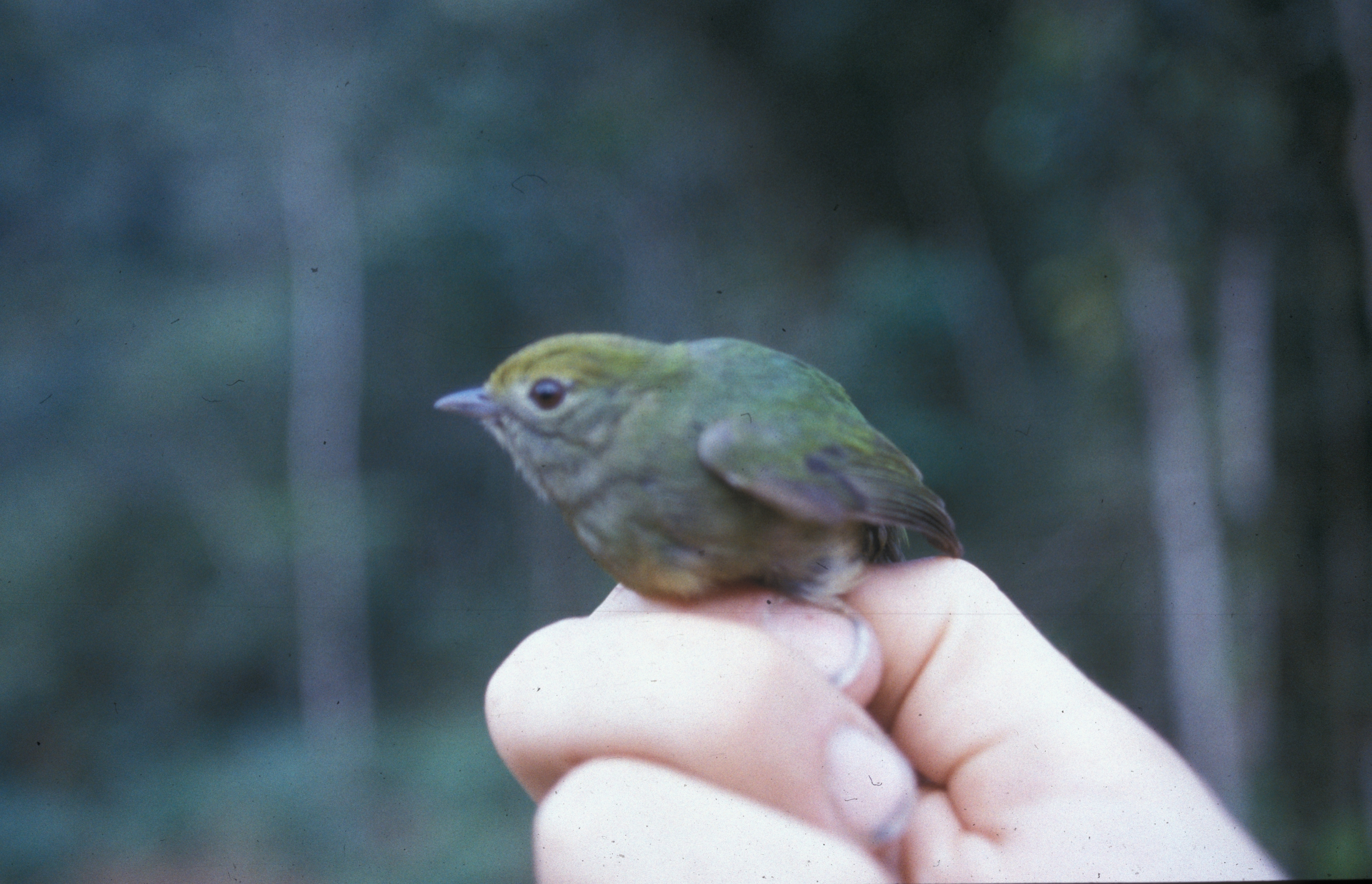
- Female

Conservation status
- Least Concern (IUCN 3.1)

Scientific classification
- Kingdom: Animalia
- Phylum: Chordata
- Class: Aves
- Order: Passeriformes
- Family: Pipridae
- Genus: Lepidothrix
- Species: L. isidorei

Binomial name
- Lepidothrix isidorei (Sclater, PL, 1852)

Synonyms
- Pipra isidorei P.L.Sclater, 1852

= Blue-rumped manakin =

Species of bird

Lepidothrix isidorei - Blue-rumped Manakin

The blue-rumped manakin (Lepidothrix isidorei) is a species of bird in the family Pipridae. It is found in Colombia, Ecuador, and Peru.

== Taxonomy and systematics ==
The blue-rumped manakin was originally described in 1852 as Pipra isidorei. By the late 1900s genus Lepidothrix was recognized as separate from Pipra and several species including the blue-rumped manakin were assigned to it.

The blue-rumped manakin has two subspecies, the nominate L. i. isidorei (Sclater, PL, 1852) and L. i. leucopygia (Hellmayr, 1903). Some authors have suggested that both should be treated as full species. The blue-rumped manakin and the cerulean-capped manakin (L. coeruleocapilla) are sister species.

== Description ==
The blue-rumped manakin is about 7.5 to 8.5 cm (3.0 to 3.3 in) long. The species is sexually dimorphic. Adult males of the nominate subspecies have a shiny white crown and upper nape and an azure rump and uppertail coverts. The rest of their plumage is black. Adult females have green upperparts whose color is brightest on the rump. Their tail is dusky. They have a mostly pale yellowish gray face and a gray throat. Their breast is a duller green than their back and their belly is yellowish gray. Males of subspecies L. i. leucopygia have a milky white rump and uppertail coverts with a blue tinge on the upper and lower edges. Females of L. i. leucopygia are identical to the nominate. Both sexes of both subspecies have a dark brownish red iris, a blackish maxilla, a gray mandible, and grayish legs and feet.

== Distribution and habitat ==
The blue-rumped manakin has a disjunct distribution. The nominate subspecies is the more northerly of the two and has a larger range. It is found along the eastern side of Colombia's Eastern Andes from Boyacá Department and continuing along the eastern Andean slope through Ecuador into northern Peru's northern Amazonas Department. Subspecies L. i. leucopygia is found in northern Peru in southern Amazonas, San Martín, and Huánuco departments. The valley of the Marañón River separates the two subspecies.

The blue-rumped manakin inhabits humid subtropical forest in the Andean foothills. In elevation it ranges between 500 and 1,500 m (1,600 and 4,900 ft) in Colombia, mostly between 1,000 and 1,700 m (3,300 and 5,600 ft) in Ecuador, and between 1,100 and 1,400 m (3,600 and 4,600 ft) in Peru.

== Behavior ==
=== Movement ===
The blue-rumped manakin is believed to be a year-round resident.

=== Feeding ===
Nothing is known about the blue-rumped manakin's diet or foraging behavior.

=== Breeding ===
Male blue-rumped manakins display to females at a lek. One was seen crouching forward on a thin branch and raising its crown and rump feathers. Nothing else is known about the species' breeding biology.

=== Vocalization ===
The male blue-rumped manakin's display call is "a rising koooit or wreee, repeated at intervals of 2–5 seconds". Its song is "a squeaky frog-like whenk repeated frequently at slow intervals".

== Status ==
The IUCN originally in 1988 assessed the blue-rumped manakin as being of Least Concern, then in 2012 as Near Threatened, and since 2021 again as of Least Concern. It has a large range; its estimated population of between 10,000 and 20,000 mature individuals is believed to be decreasing. "The primary threat to this species is considered to be accelerating deforestation in the Amazon basin as land is cleared for cattle ranching and soy production, facilitated by expansion of the road network. However, recent deforestation analyses has shown that forest loss within the species [sic] range has been low." It is considered local in Colombia and Ecuador and locally fairly common in Peru.
