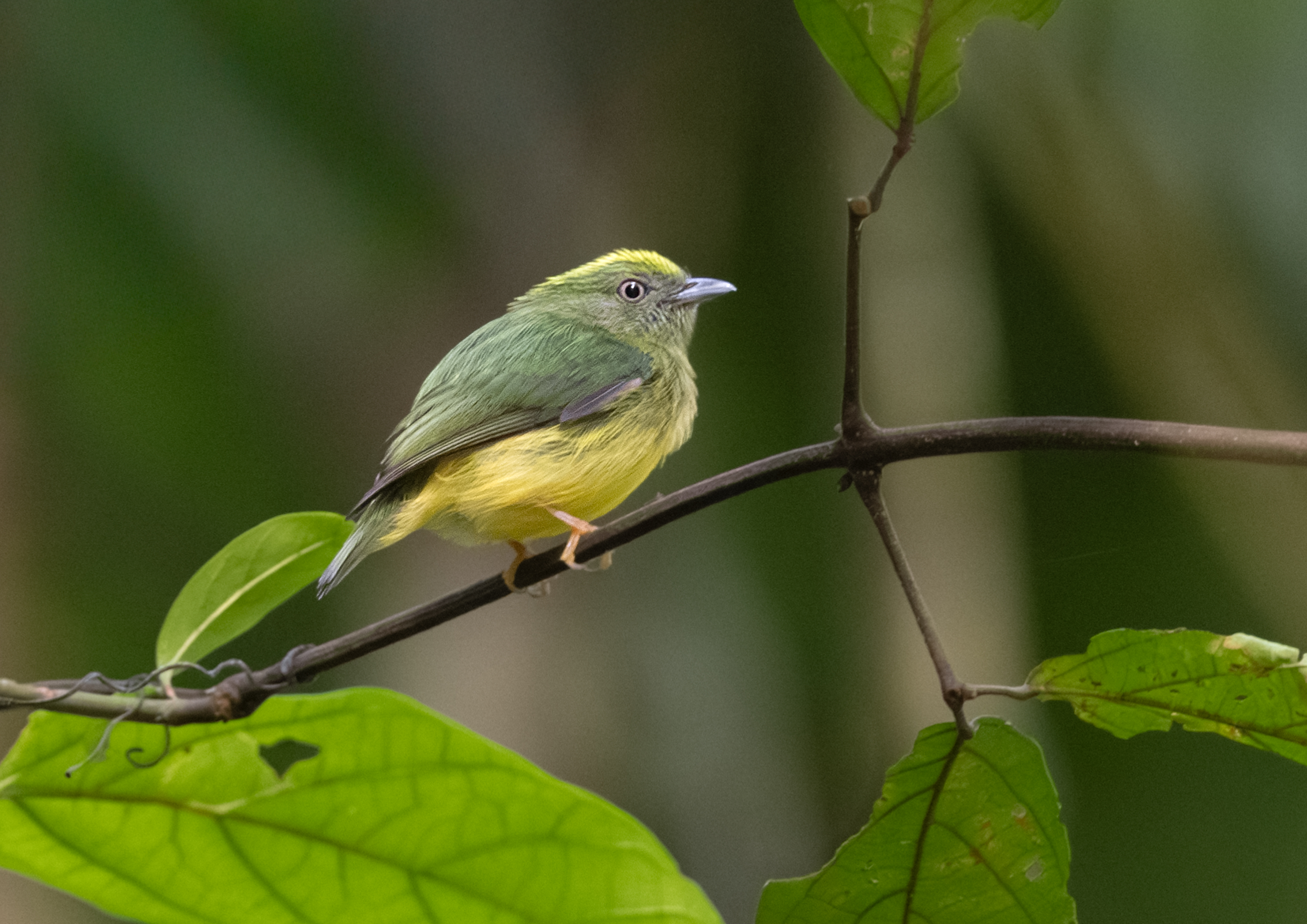
- Male
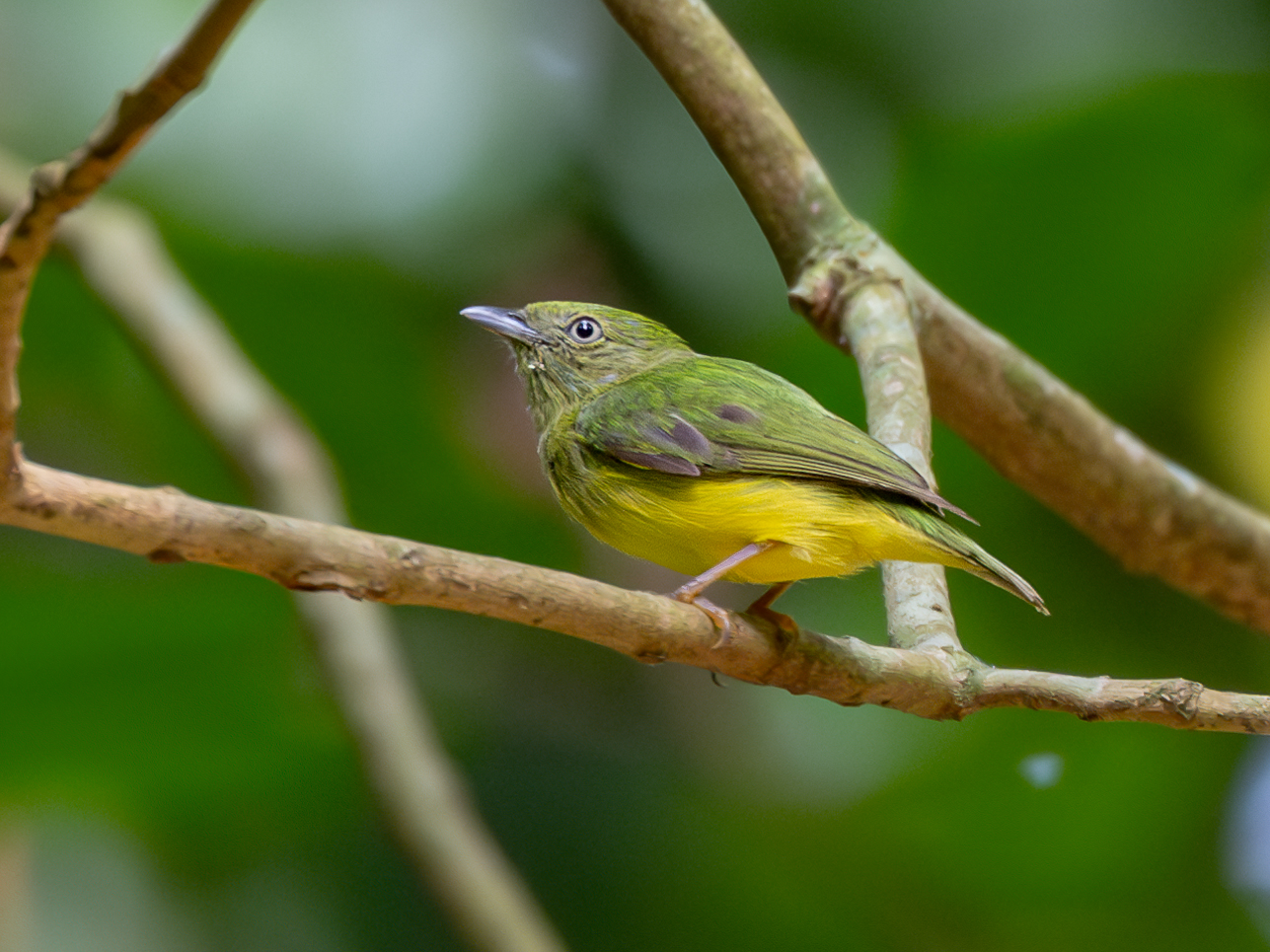
- Female

Conservation status
- Least Concern (IUCN 3.1)

Scientific classification
- Kingdom: Animalia
- Phylum: Chordata
- Class: Aves
- Order: Passeriformes
- Family: Pipridae
- Genus: Lepidothrix
- Species: L. vilasboasi

Binomial name
- Lepidothrix vilasboasi (Sick, 1959)

Synonyms
- Pipra vilasboasi Sick, 1959

= Golden-crowned manakin =

Species of bird

The golden-crowned manakin (Lepidothrix vilasboasi) is a small species of perching bird in the manakin family (Pipridae) endemic to Brazil. It is believed that the species originated as a natural hybrid of the opal-crowned and snow-crapped manakin.

== Taxonomy and systematics ==
Helmut Sick described this species in 1959 based on a series of specimens collected a few years before near a small tributary of the upper Rio Cururu-ri in the east Brazilian Amazon. The species was only rediscovered (in part due to confusion over the original type locality) in 2002 and is now known from a number of locations in an area bordered by the Jamanxim and Cururu rivers and the Cachimbo Range. There was also concern that it was not a full species but rather a hybrid between the opal-crowned manakin (L. iris) and snow-capped manakin (L. nattereri).

Genomic analyses reported in 2017 provide evidence that (one) the golden-crowned manakin is a full species, and (two) that it represents one of the few cases of hybrid species in birds. The authors posit that the species evolved from opal-crowned x snow-capped hybrids. The golden-crowned manakin closely resembles both its putative parent species with the exception of its unique yellow crown. The white crown of the snow-capped manakin and the opalescent crown of the opal-crowned manakin represent structural colors produced by different nanostructural organizations of the feather barb keratin matrix. The yellow crown of the golden-crowned manakin is intermediate between the two parent species which is thought to have disrupted the structural mechanisms of the parents leading to the much duller look of its crown. Following hybridization, sexual selection is proposed to have favored sequestration of yellow producing carotenoid pigments into the crown as a way to render males more attractive to females.

The golden-crowned manakin is monotypic.

== Description ==
The golden-crowned manakin is about 8.5 to 9 cm (3.3 to 3.5 in) long. The species is sexually dimorphic. Adult males have a greenish gold crown and nape. Their rest of their head and their upper back are green and their lower back and uppertail coverts yellow-green. Their wings and tail are mostly blackish with wide green feather edges. Their chin, throat, and breast are green and their belly and undertail coverts yellow. Adult females have an entirely green head and upperparts and are otherwise like males. Both sexes have a pale grayish iris, a pale bluish bill, and pinkish legs and feet.

== Distribution and habitat ==
The golden-crowned manakin has a small range in Brazil's southwestern Pará along the upper Cururu and Jamanxim rivers; both are tributaries of the Tapajós River. It inhabits humid forest at elevations up to about 200 m (700 ft).

== Behavior ==
=== Movement ===
The golden-crowned manakin is believed to be a year-round resident.

=== Feeding ===
The golden-crowned manakin feeds on small fruits and insects.

=== Breeding ===
Nothing is known about the golden-crowned manakin's breeding biology.

=== Vocalization ===
The male golden-crowned manakin's call is "a burry prreee" that is sometimes made in a series.

== Status ==
The IUCN originally in 1988 assessed the golden-crowned manakin as Threatened, then in 1994 as Vulnerable, and since 2021 as being of Least Concern. Its estimated population of at least 15,000 mature individuals is believed to be decreasing. "The species is threatened by ongoing deforestation. The region is being developed for cattle-ranching and soya bean plantations. Forest at the 2002 [rediscovery ]locality at Novo Progresso has already been destroyed." The species is known from "only a handful of sites". Though it "[a]ppears to tolerate significant forest perturbation, including selective logging...Fieldwork [is] urgently required with the aim of determining the species’ current status and distribution, and the extent of habitat destruction and further threats at known sites".
