= Krestovka =

Krestovka Крестовка
- Village
- Location within Vologda Oblast Location within Russia
- Coordinates: 58°50′N 40°14′E
- Country: Russia
- Region: Vologda Oblast
- District: Gryazovetsky District
- Time zone: UTC+3:00

Krestovka (Russian: Крестовка) is a rural locality (a village) in Rostilovskoye Rural Settlement, Gryazovetsky District, Vologda Oblast, Russia. The population was 35 as of 2002.

== Geography ==
Krestovka is located 4 km (2.5 mi) south of Gryazovets (the district's administrative centre) by road. Svistunovo is the nearest rural locality.
