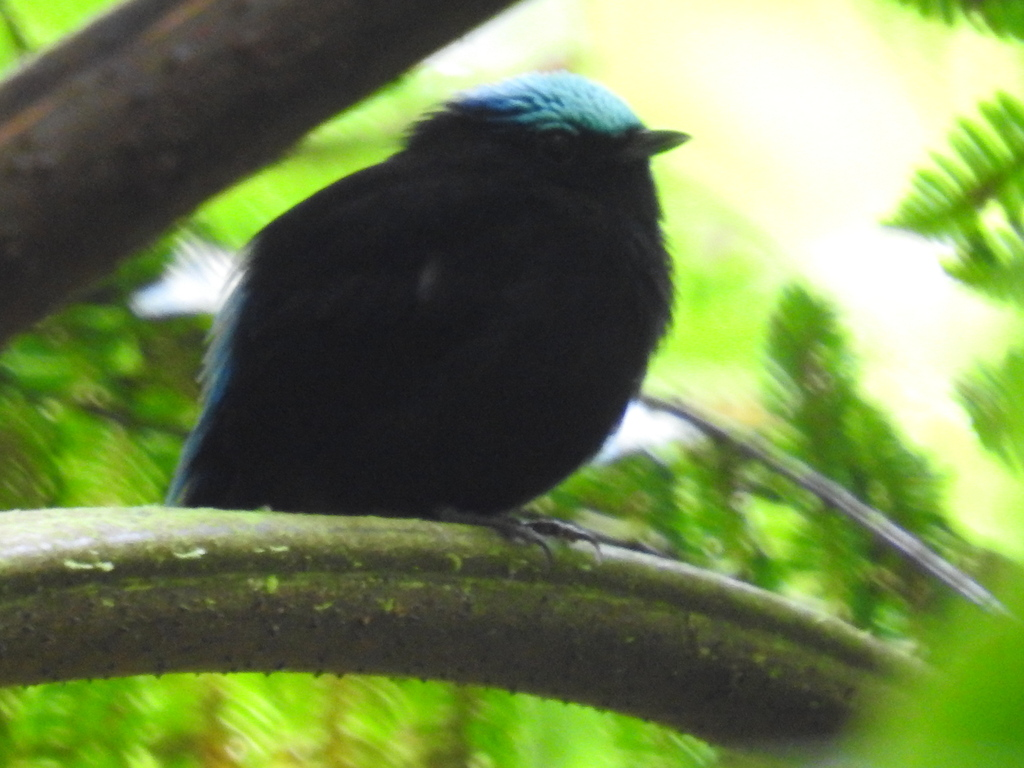

Conservation status
- Least Concern (IUCN 3.1)

Scientific classification
- Kingdom: Animalia
- Phylum: Chordata
- Class: Aves
- Order: Passeriformes
- Family: Pipridae
- Genus: Lepidothrix
- Species: L. coeruleocapilla

Binomial name
- Lepidothrix coeruleocapilla (Tschudi, 1844)

Synonyms
- Pipra coeruleocapilla Tschudi, 1844

= Cerulean-capped manakin =

Species of bird

The cerulean-capped manakin (Lepidothrix coeruleocapilla) is a species of bird in the family Pipridae. It is endemic to Peru.

== Taxonomy and systematics ==
The cerulean-capped manakin was originally described in 1844 as Pipra coeruleo-capilla. By the late 1900s genus Lepidothrix was recognized as separate from Pipra and several species including the cerulean-capped manakin were assigned to it.

The cerulean-capped manakin is monotypic. It and the blue-rumped manakin (L. isidorei) are sister species.

== Description ==
The cerulean-capped manakin is 8.5 to 9 cm (3.3 to 3.5 in) long and weighs about 9 g (0.32 oz). The species is sexually dimorphic. Adult males have a bright blue crown and upper nape and a deeper blue rump and uppertail coverts. The rest of their plumage is black. Adult females have green upperparts whose color is brightest on the rump. Their tail is dusky green. They have a mostly pale grayish face and throat. Their breast is a duller green than their back and their belly is yellowish gray. Both sexes have a dark brownish red iris, a blackish maxilla, a gray mandible, and grayish legs and feet.

== Distribution and habitat ==
The cerulean-capped manakin is found on the eastern slope of the Andes of central and southeastern Peru between the departments of Huánuco south to Puno. It inhabits the understory of humid forest in the foothills at elevations between 600 and 1,700 m (2,000 and 5,600 ft).

== Behavior ==
=== Movement ===
The cerulean-capped manakin is believed to be a year-round resident.

=== Feeding ===
Nothing definite is known about the cerulean-capped manakin's diet or foraging behavior. A female has been seen feeding on unidentified fruits.

=== Breeding ===
The cerulean-capped manakin's breeding season has not been defined, but the one known nest was found in November. It was a shallow cup in the fork of a tree branch about 1.7 m (6 ft) above the ground. It was made from rootlets and attached using spider web and the tree's own live vegetation; more live material dangled below it as a "tail". The female was incubating an egg or eggs.

=== Vocalization ===
The cerulean-capped manakin's song is "a burry, frog-like djew-HAI" and its call "a rising, mewed whistle: weeee?".

== Status ==
The IUCN has assessed the cerulean-capped manakin as being of Least Concern. Its population size is not known and is believed to be stable. No immediate threats have been identified. It is considered fairly common.
