= Helmut Sick =

German-Brazilian ornithologist

Helmut Sick (10 January 1910 – 5 March 1991) was a German-Brazilian ornithologist.

Sick was born in Leipzig, Germany. He emigrated to Brazil in 1939.

A prominent ornithologist in Brazil, Sick published more than 200 papers, including his most influential work: Ornitologia Brasileira, Uma Introdução (1984), later translated into English as Birds in Brazil: A Natural History (1993). He also led scientific expeditions in remote areas in Brazil and described several species of birds, including the Brasília tapaculo, long-tailed cinclodes, Stresemann's bristlefront and golden-crowned manakin.
