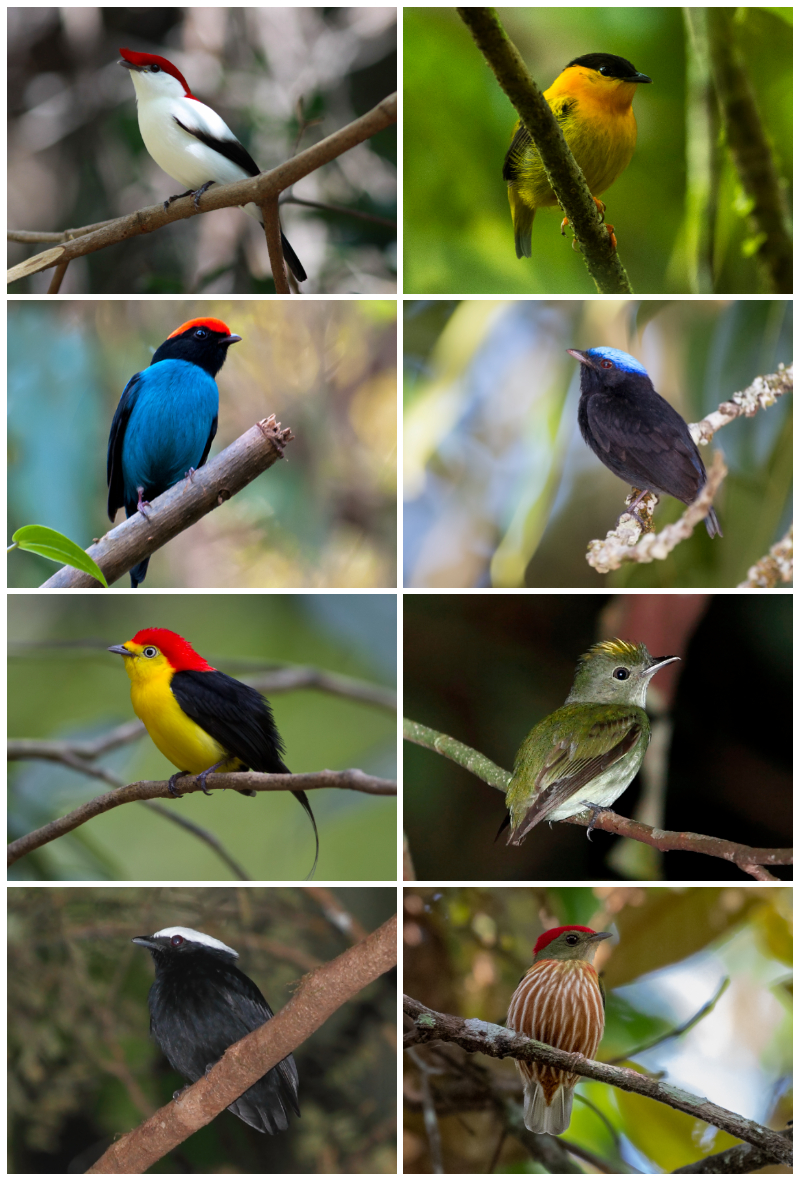
- Diversity of Pipridae

Scientific classification
- Kingdom: Animalia
- Phylum: Chordata
- Class: Aves
- Order: Passeriformes
- Parvorder: Tyrannida
- Family: Pipridae; Rafinesque, 1815

Species
- Many, see text
- Manakin range

= Manakin =

Manakins

Family of South American birds

The manakins are a family, Pipridae, of small suboscine passerine birds. The group contains 55 species distributed through the American tropics. The name is from Middle Dutch mannekijn "little man" (also the source of the different bird name mannikin).

== Description ==
Manakins range in size from 7 to 15 cm (3 to 6 in) and in weight from 8 to 30 g (0.28 to 1.06 oz). Species in the genus Tyranneutes are the smallest manakins, those in the genus Antilophia are believed to be the largest (since the genus Schiffornis are no longer considered manakins). They are compact stubby birds with short tails, broad and rounded wings, and big heads. The bill is short and has a wide gap. Females and first-year males have dull green plumage; most species are sexually dichromatic in their plumage, the males being mostly black with striking colours in patches, and in some species having long, decorative tail or crown feathers or erectile throat feathers. In some species, males from two to four years old have a distinctive subadult plumage.

The syrinx or "voicebox" is distinctive in manakins, setting them apart from the related families Cotingidae and Tyrannidae. Furthermore, it is so acutely variable within the group that genera and even species may be identified by the syrinx alone, unlike birds of most oscine families. The sounds made are whistles, trills, and buzzes.

== Distribution and habitat ==
Manakins occur from southern Mexico to northern Argentina, Paraguay, and southern Brazil, and on Trinidad and Tobago as well. They are highly arboreal and are almost exclusively forest and woodland birds. Most species live in humid tropical lowlands, with a few in dry forests, river forests, and the subtropical Andes. Some highland species have altitudinal migrations.

== Behaviour and ecology ==
- Pipridae
  - Neopelminae
    - Protopelma – Serra do Mar tyrant-manakin
    - - Neopelma – 4 species: tyrant-manakins
      - Tyranneutes – 2 species: tyrant-manakins
  - Piprinae
    - Ilicurini
      - Chiroxiphia – 7 species
      - - Ilicura – pin-tailed manakin
        - - Corapipo – 3 species
          - Masius – golden-winged manakin
    - Piprini
      - Xenopipo – 2 species
      - - Chloropipo – 2 species
        - - - Cryptopipo – 2 species
            - Lepidothrix – 9 species
          - - - Heterocercus – 3 species
              - Manacus – 4 species
            - - Pipra – 3 species
              - - Machaeropterus – 5 species
                - - Ceratopipra – 5 species
                  - Pseudopipra – white-crowned manakin

Phylogeny based on a study of the suboscines by Michael Harvey and colleagues published in 2020. Subfamilies and tribes follow Leite et al. (2021).

=== Feeding ===
Manakins feed in the understory on small fruit (but often remarkably large for the size of the bird) including berries, and to a lesser degree, insects. Since they take fruit in flight as other species "hawk" for insects, they are believed to have evolved from insect-eating birds. Females have big territories from which they do not necessarily exclude other birds of their species, instead feeding somewhat socially. Males spend much of their time together at courtship sites. Manakins sometimes join mixed feeding flocks.

=== Reproduction ===
Many manakin species have spectacular lekking courtship rituals, which are especially elaborate in the genera Pipra and Chiroxiphia. The rituals are characterized by a unique, species-specific pattern of vocalizations and movements such as jumping, bowing, wing vibration, wing snapping, and acrobatic flight. The members of the genera Machaeropterus and Manacus have heavily modified wing feathers, which they use to make buzzing and snapping sounds. Members of Manacus and Ceratopipra have superfast wing movements. The ability to produce these wing movements is supported by specialized peripheral androgen receptors in the muscular tissue.

Building of the nest (an open cup, generally low in vegetation), the incubation for 18 to 21 days, and care of the young for 13 to 15 days are undertaken by the female alone, since most manakins do not form stable pairs. (The helmeted manakin does form pairs, but the male's contribution is limited to defending the territory.) The normal clutch is two eggs, which are buff or dull white, marked with brown.

Lekking polygyny seems to have been a characteristic of the family's original ancestor, and the associated sexual selection led to an adaptive radiation in which relationships may be traced by similarities in displays. Manakin sexual displays within these leks among the ancestral subfamily Neopelminae are the most simple, while displays among the more evolutionarily recent subfamily Piprinae are the most complex. An evolutionary explanation connecting lekking to fruit-eating has been proposed.

== Species list ==
The family Pipridae was introduced (as Pipraria) by the French polymath Constantine Samuel Rafinesque in 1815. The members of the genus Schiffornis were previously placed in this family, but are now placed in Tityridae. All genera and species listed below, as well as their arrangement, follow AviList v2026.

=== Neopelminae ===
Image	Genus	Living species
	Protopelma van Els et al., 2023	Serra do Mar tyrant-manakin, Protopelma chrysolophum
	Tyranneutes P.L. Sclater & Salvin, 1881	Tiny tyrant-manakin, Tyranneutes virescens; Dwarf tyrant-manakin, Tyranneutes stolzmanni
	Neopelma P.L. Sclater, 1861	Wied's tyrant-manakin, Neopelma aurifrons; Pale-bellied tyrant-manakin, Neopelma pallescens; Saffron-crested tyrant-manakin, Neopelma chrysocephalum; Sulphur-bellied tyrant-manakin, Neopelma sulphureiventer

=== Piprinae ===
==== Ilicurini ====
Image	Genus	Living species
	Ilicura L. Reichenbach, 1850	Pin-tailed manakin, Ilicura militaris
	Masius Bonaparte, 1850	Golden-winged manakin, Masius chrysopterus
	Corapipo Bonaparte, 1854	White-throated manakin, Corapipo gutturalis; White-bibbed manakin, Corapipo leucorrhoa; White-ruffed manakin, Corapipo altera
	Chiroxiphia Cabanis, 1847	Yungas manakin, Chiroxiphia boliviana; Blue manakin, Chiroxiphia caudata; Helmeted manakin, Chiroxiphia galeata; Araripe manakin, Chiroxiphia bokermanni; Blue-backed manakin, Chiroxiphia pareola; Lance-tailed manakin, Chiroxiphia lanceolata; Long-tailed manakin, Chiroxiphia linearis

==== Piprini ====
Image	Genus	Living species
	Xenopipo Cabanis, 1847	Black manakin, Xenopipo atronitens; Olive manakin, Xenopipo uniformis
	Chloropipo Cabanis & Heine, 1860	Yellow-headed manakin, Chloropipo flavicapilla; Jet manakin, Chloropipo unicolor
	Cryptopipo Ohlson et al., 2013	Green manakin, Cryptopipo holochlora; Choco manakin, Cryptopipo litae
	Lepidothrix Bonaparte, 1854	White-fronted manakin, Lepidothrix serena; Orange-bellied manakin, Lepidothrix suavissima; Cerulean-capped manakin, Lepidothrix coeruleocapilla; Blue-rumped manakin, Lepidothrix isidorei; Velvety manakin, Lepidothrix velutina; Blue-capped manakin, Lepidothrix coronata; Golden-crowned manakin, Lepidothrix vilasboasi; Opal-crowned manakin, Lepidothrix iris; Snow-capped manakin, Lepidothrix nattereri
	Heterocercus Sclater, 1862	Orange-crested manakin, Heterocercus aurantiivertex; Flame-crested manakin, Heterocercus linteatus; Yellow-crested manakin, Heterocercus flavivertex
	Manacus Brisson, 1760	White-bearded manakin, Manacus manacus; Golden-collared manakin, Manacus vitellinus; White-collared manakin, Manacus candei; Orange-collared manakin, Manacus aurantiacus
	Pipra Linnaeus, 1764	Wire-tailed manakin, Pipra filicauda; Crimson-hooded manakin, Pipra aureola (also known as orange-headed manakin); Band-tailed manakin, Pipra fasciicauda
	Machaeropterus Bonaparte, 1854	Club-winged manakin, Machaeropterus deliciosus; Fiery-capped manakin, Machaeropterus pyrocephalus; Kinglet manakin, Machaeropterus regulus; Painted manakin, Machaeropterus eckelberryi; Striolated manakin, Machaeropterus striolatus
	Pseudopipra Kirwan et al., 2016	White-crowned manakin, Pseudopipra pipra
	Ceratopipra Bonaparte, 1854	Scarlet-horned manakin, Ceratopipra cornuta; Red-capped manakin, Ceratopipra mentalis; Red-headed manakin, Ceratopipra rubrocapilla; Round-tailed manakin, Ceratopipra chloromeros; Golden-headed manakin, Ceratopipra erythrocephala
