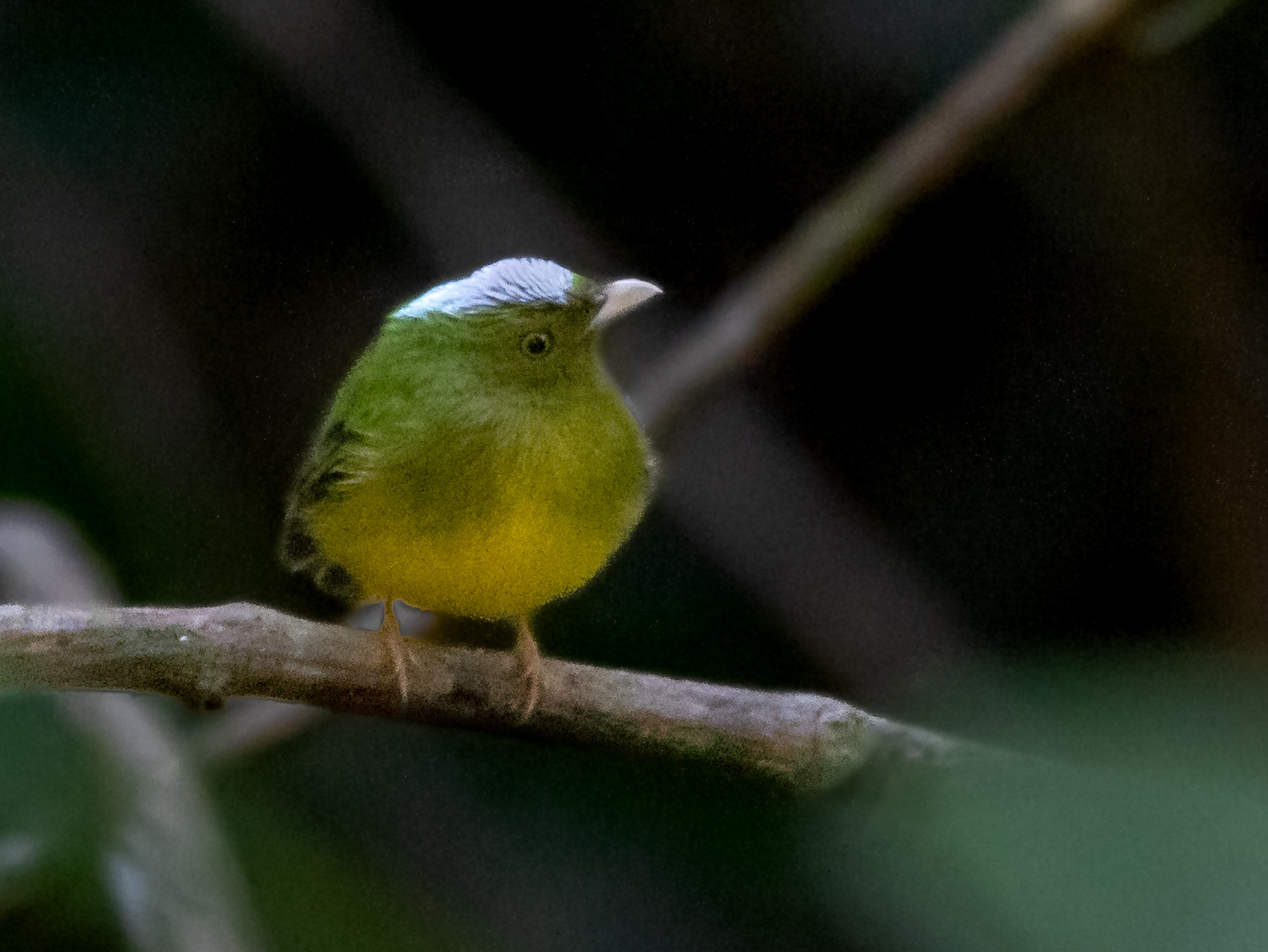

Conservation status
- Vulnerable (IUCN 3.1)

Scientific classification
- Kingdom: Animalia
- Phylum: Chordata
- Class: Aves
- Order: Passeriformes
- Family: Pipridae
- Genus: Lepidothrix
- Species: L. iris

Binomial name
- Lepidothrix iris (Schinz, 1851)

Synonyms
- Pipra iris Schinz, 1851

= Opal-crowned manakin =

Species of bird

The opal-crowned manakin (Lepidothrix iris) is a Vulnerable species of bird in the family Pipridae. It is endemic to Brazil.

== Taxonomy and systematics ==
The opal-crowned manakin was originally described in 1851 as Pipra iris. By the late 1900s genus Lepidothrix was recognized as separate from Pipra and several species including the opal-crowned manakin were assigned to it.

The opal-crowned manakin has two subspecies, the nominate L. i. iris (Schinz, 1851) and L. i. eucephala (Todd, 1928).

The opal-crowned manakin and the snow-capped manakin (L. nattereri) are believed to have hybridized multiple times in the past with the hybrids evolving to produce the golden-crowned manakin (L. vilasboasi). A hybrid zone between the snow-capped and opal-crowned manakins exists where the two species' ranges come into geographic contact in the Cachimbo Range.

== Description ==
The opal-crowned manakin is about 9 cm (3.5 in) long and weighs 7.8 to 9.5 g (0.28 to 0.34 oz). The species is sexually dimorphic. Adult males of the nominate subspecies have a thin green forehead band and an opalescent crown and upper nape. The crown color varies from white to bluish depending on the relative angles of the sun and the viewer. The rest of their plumage is olive-green except for a yellow belly and undertail coverts. Adult females have a green crown and nape and are otherwise like males. Males of subspecies L. i. eucephala have almost no green on the forehead; their opalescent crown color begins just above the bill. Females have a bluish crown and nape and are otherwise like males. Both sexes of both subspecies have a pale buff or cream iris, a pale bluish bill, and pinkish legs and feet.

== Distribution and habitat ==
The opal-crowned manakin has a disjunct distribution in two parts of the Brazilian Amazon Basin. The nominate subspecies has the larger and more easterly range. It is found from near Belém in eastern Pará east to northwestern Maranhão and south to the upper drainage of the Xingu River. Subspecies L. i. eucephala is found along the right bank of the lower Tapajós River in southwestern Pará. The species inhabits humid lowland terra firme forest and mature secondary woodland. In elevation it ranges from sea level to about 200 m (700 ft).

== Behavior ==
=== Movement ===
The opal-crowned manakin is believed to be a year-round resident.

=== Feeding ===
Nothing is known about the opal-crowned manakin's diet or feeding behavior.

=== Breeding ===
The opal-crowned manakin's breeding season has not been defined but includes August. Males display to females either singly or in a lek. They posture from a perch and make quick flight maneuvers. Nothing else is known about the species' breeding biology.

=== Vocalization ===
The opal-crowned manakin's call is a "very (almost [extremely]) high upslurred feer, repeated at short intervals".

== Status ==
The IUCN originally in 1988 assessed the opal-crowned manakin as being of Least Concern but since 2012 as Vulnerable. It has a limited range; its estimated population of at least 250,000 mature individuals is believed to be decreasing. "The species is threatened by continuing deforestation as land is cleared for cattle ranching and soy production, facilitated by expansion of the road network...Recent changes to environmental policy in Brazil are seemingly incentivizing farmers to clear more land, and the rate of clear-fell deforestation and wildfire intensity in Brazilian Amazonia have increased since 2018." It is considered "[u]ncommon or rare to locally fairly common". "Since it appears to tolerate a degree of habitat degradation, its population is projected to decline by 30–69% or more over three generations." It occurs in a few protected areas.
