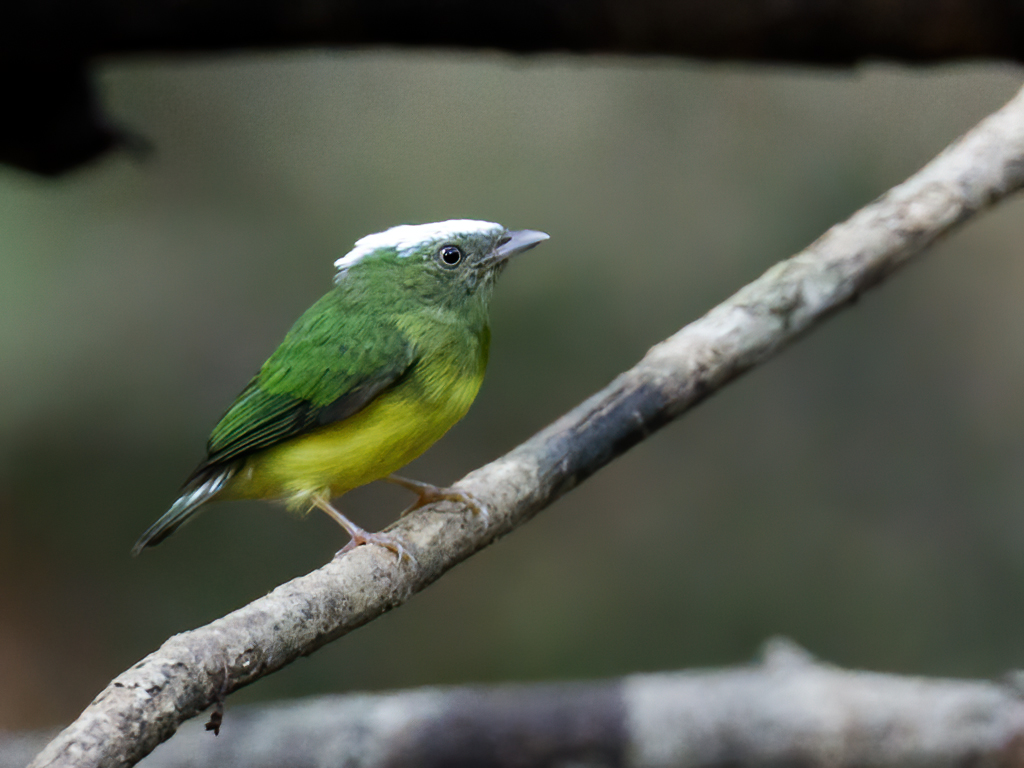
- Male

Conservation status
- Least Concern (IUCN 3.1)

Scientific classification
- Kingdom: Animalia
- Phylum: Chordata
- Class: Aves
- Order: Passeriformes
- Family: Pipridae
- Genus: Lepidothrix
- Species: L. nattereri

Binomial name
- Lepidothrix nattereri (Sclater, PL, 1865)

Synonyms
- Pipra nattereri P.L.Sclater, 1865

= Snow-capped manakin =

Species of bird

The snow-capped manakin (Lepidothrix nattereri) is a species of bird in the family Pipridae. It is found in Bolivia and Brazil.

== Taxonomy and systematics ==
The snow-capped manakin was originally described in 1865 as Pipra nattereri. By the late 1900s genus Lepidothrix was recognized as separate from Pipra and several species including the snow-capped manakin were assigned to it.

The snow-capped manakin has two subspecies, the nominate L. n. nattereri (Sclater, PL, 1865) and L. n. gracilis (Hellmayr, 1903).

The snow-capped manakin and the opal-crowned manakin (L. iris) are believed to have hybridized multiple times in the past with the hybrids evolving to produce the golden-crowned manakin (L. vilasboasi). A hybrid zone between the snow-capped and opal-crowned manakins exists where the two species' ranges come into geographic contact in the Cachimbo Range.

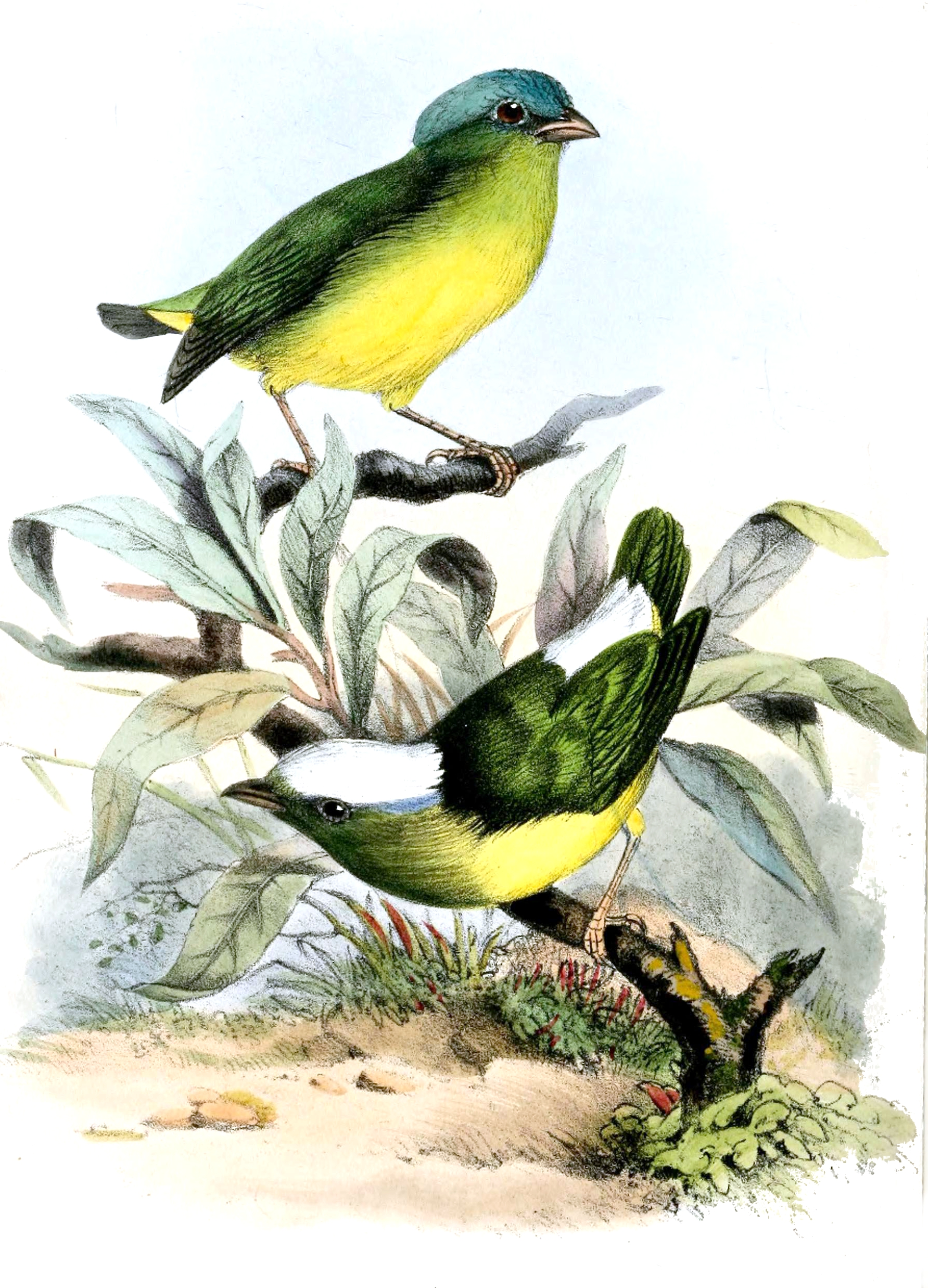

== Description ==
The snow-capped manakin is 8.5 to 9.2 cm (3.3 to 3.6 in) long and weighs about 8 to 10 g (0.28 to 0.35 oz). The species is sexually dimorphic and females are larger than males. Adult males of the nominate subspecies have a white crown and upper nape and a white lower back to uppertail coverts. Their upperparts are green. Their flight feathers and tail are blackish with wide green edges. Their chin and breast are a slightly lighter green than their back and their belly and undertail coverts are yellow. Adult females have a blue crown and nape. Their upperparts are entirely the same green as the male's, including the lower back to uppertail coverts, and their wings, tail, and underparts are like the male's. Males of subspecies L. n. gracilis are like nominate males; females' crowns are the same green as the rest of their upperparts. Both sexes of both subspecies have a yellowish white or pale yellow iris, a pale bluish bill, and pinkish legs and feet.

== Distribution and habitat ==
The snow-capped manakin is a bird of the central Amazon Basin south of the Amazon River. The nominate subspecies is the more northerly of the two. It is found in Brazil from the Madeira River east to the Tapajós River and its tributaries and south to Calama in far northern Rondônia. Subspecies L. n. gracilis is found from the upper Madeira south of Calama east to the upper basin of the Xingu River and south very slightly into northeastern Bolivia. The species primarily inhabits humid lowland terra firme forest. In elevation it reaches 500 m (1,600 ft).

== Behavior ==
=== Movement ===
The snow-capped manakin is believed to be a year-round resident.

=== Feeding ===
Little definite is known about the snow-capped manakin's diet or foraging behavior. It is known to eat insects and spiders and is assumed to also feed on fruit.

=== Breeding ===
The one known nest of a snow-capped manakin was found in December 2008. It was a cup woven from dry palm leaves lined with thin bark strips, bonded with spider web, and suspended in a branch fork about 50 cm (20 in) above the ground. It contained two eggs that were pinkish with brown blotches. Nothing else is known about the species' breeding biology.

=== Vocalization ===
One call of the snow-capped manakin is a "high, slightly grating, steeply ascending tuWeét". Another, made by males, is "a soft, short chí-wrrr".

== Status ==
The IUCN has assessed the snow-capped manakin as being of Least Concern. It has a large range; its population size is not known and is believed to be decreasing. No immediate threats have been identified. It is considered fairly common in Brazil. It is a poorly known species but does occur in at least one national park in each of Brazil and Bolivia.
