= Yunnan keelback =

There are two species of snake named Yunnan keelback:

- Hebius parallelus, endemic to Asia
- Hebius clerki, found in India, Myanmar, China, and Nepal
