= Hebius modestus =

Scientific classification
- Kingdom: Animalia
- Phylum: Chordata
- Class: Reptilia
- Order: Squamata
- Suborder: Serpentes
- Family: Colubridae
- Genus: Hebius
- Species: H. modestus

Binomial name
- Hebius modestus (Günther, 1875)

Synonyms
- Tropidonotus modestus Günther, 1875; Nerodia modesta – Wall, 1923; Natrix modesta – M.A. Smith, 1943; Amphiesma modesta – Malnate, 1960; Paranatrix modesta – Mahendra, 1984; Amphiesma modesta – Cox et al., 1998; Amphiesma modestum – David et al., 2007

Species of snake

Hebius modestus, commonly known as the modest keelback or Günther's keelback, is a species of natricine snake endemic to Asia.

== Geographic range ==
Confirmed range:

- India: Meghalaya (Khasi Hills), Arunachal Pradesh
- China:Yunnan Province
- Myanmar: Kachin, Shan States

Disputed records: Historical reports from Vietnam, Cambodia, Laos, Thailand, and Guangdong/Guizhou (China) are questionable or misidentifications. It possibly occurs in Bhutan.

The type locality is Khasi Hills, India.

== Description ==
Adults may attain 60 cm (2 feet) in overall length; tail length 18 cm (7 inches).

Dorsum: Dark grayish-brown to olive brown, scattered with black spots or blotches. A dorsolateral series of ochre-yellow, orange-brown, or reddish-brown stripes (often reduced to elongate blotches) extends from the nape to the tail base on the 4th–7th dorsal scale rows. Postocular streak is absent.

Ventrally it may be yellowish, or yellowish in the middle and blackish on the sides, or almost entirely blackish.

Venter: Pale ochre-brown centrally, broadly edged with dark brown or blackish on the outer quarter of ventrals. Series of blackish spots on each side of the ventrals.

Head: Labial sutures black; short, broad, horizontal pale streaks on the neck sides before the dorsolateral stripe along with a streak on the nape, behind the parietal scales.

=== Scalation ===
- Dorsal scales: 19-19-17 rows, weakly keeled at midbody and posteriorly; smooth on first dorsal scale row
- Ventrals: 143–163 in males, 154–168 in females
- Anal: Divided
- Subcaudals: 104–122, divided
- Supralabials: 8–9; 3rd–5th entering the eye
- Infralabials: 8–9
- Anterior temporals: 1 or rarely 2; rectangular and elongate
- Preoculars: 1 (occasionally absent)
- Maxillary teeth: 27–30, with the last two moderately enlarged

== Generic revisions ==
The species was initially placed in the genus Tropidonotus (Günther, 1875), later moved to Amphiesma (Malnate, 1960) but in 2014 it was transferred to Hebius by Guo et al. (2014) based on molecular and morphological data.

=== Differentiation from congeners ===
H. modestus can be distinguished from similar species by:

- Vs. Hebius venningi: Higher ventral counts (143–163 vs. 131–142), absence of postocular streak
- Vs. Hebius lacrima: Fewer ventrals (143–163 vs. 147), continuous vs. interrupted supralabial stripe
- Vs. Herpetoreas xenura: Fewer supralabials (8–9 vs. 9), continuous ventral blotches vs. discontinuous

== Habitat ==
In India this species is found in forests at altitudes of 600-1,500 m (approximately 2,000-5,000 feet).
