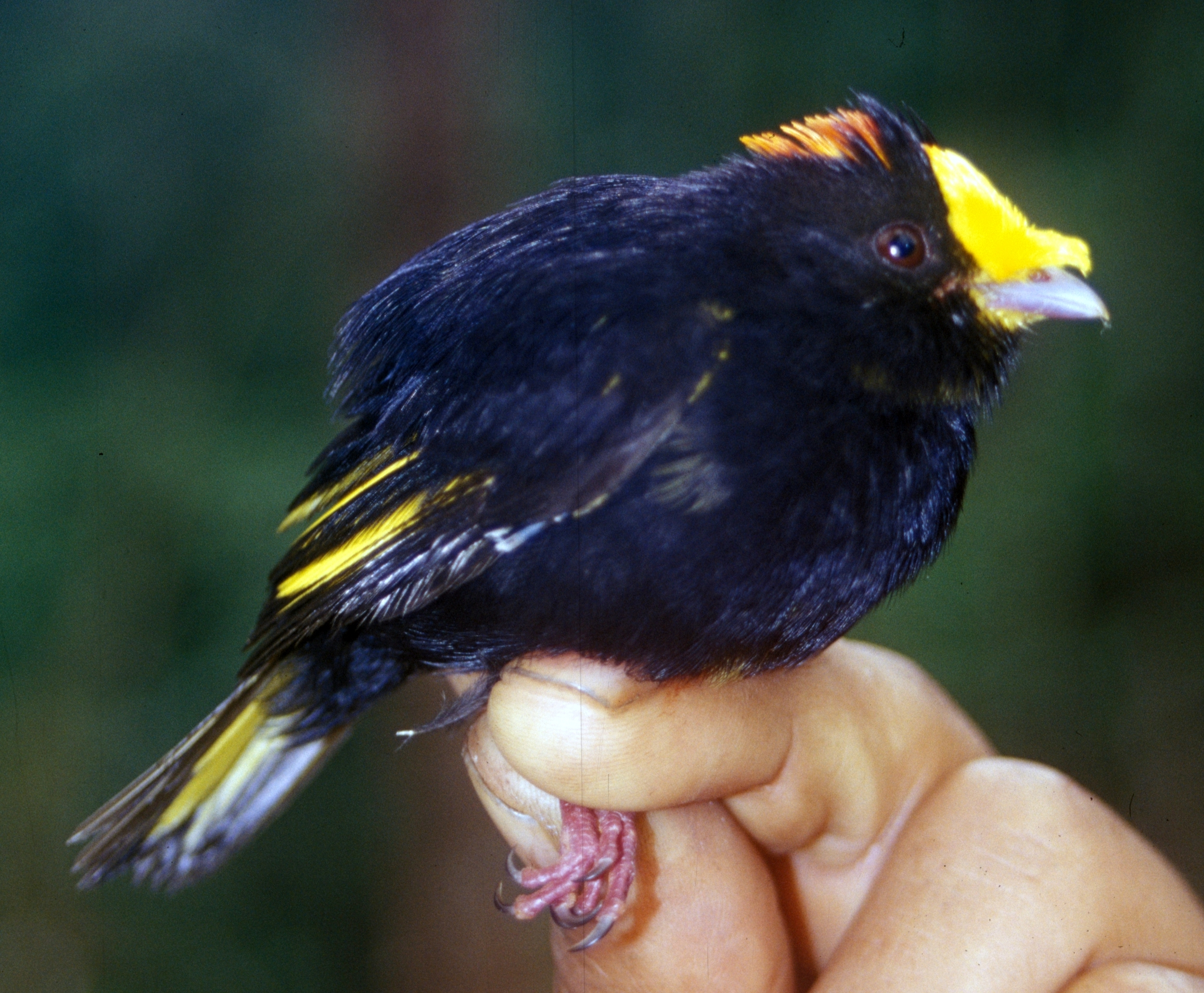

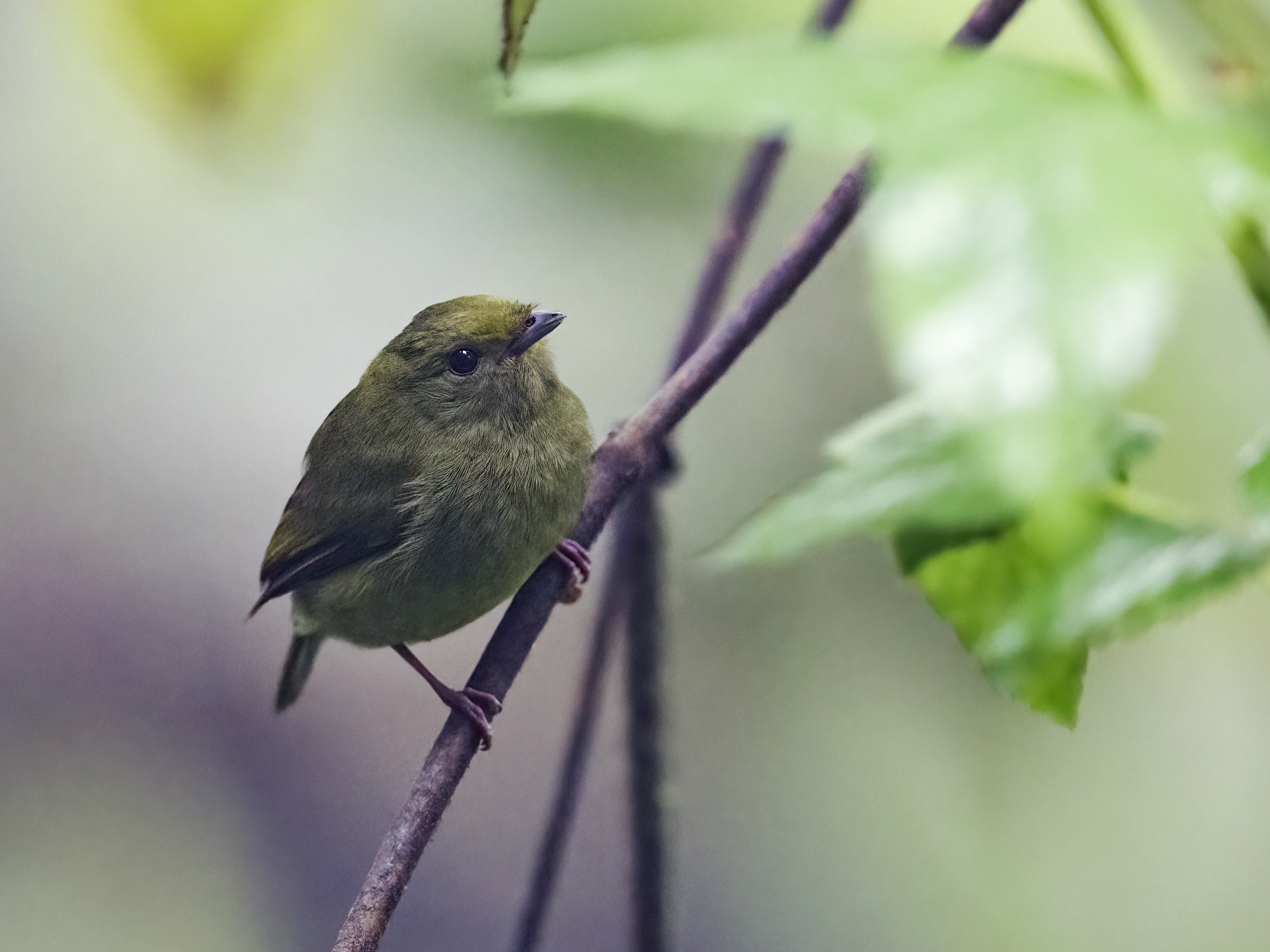
- Male (above) and Female (below).

Conservation status
- Least Concern (IUCN 3.1)

Scientific classification
- Kingdom: Animalia
- Phylum: Chordata
- Class: Aves
- Order: Passeriformes
- Family: Pipridae
- Genus: Masius; Bonaparte, 1850
- Species: M. chrysopterus

Binomial name
- Masius chrysopterus (Lafresnaye, 1843)

= Golden-winged manakin =

Species of bird

The golden-winged manakin (Masius chrysopterus) is a species of bird in the family Pipridae. It is found in Colombia, Ecuador, Peru, and Venezuela.

== Taxonomy and systematics ==
The golden-winged manakin was originally described in 1843 as Pipra chrysoptera. In 1850 Bonaparte erected genus Masius for it.

The genera Masius and Corapipo are sisters and genus Ilicura is sister to them. The golden-winged manakin is the only member of its genus and has these five subspecies:

- M. c. bellus Hartert, EJO & Hellmayr, 1903
- M. c. pax Meyer de Schauensee, 1952
- M. c. coronulatus Sclater, PL, 1860
- M. c. chrysopterus (Lafresnaye, 1843)
- M. c. peruvianus Carriker, 1934

Because there is little difference in plumage among the subspecies and no genetic data for them, authors have suggested that some of the subspecies are not valid.

== Description ==
The golden-winged manakin is about 11 cm (4.3 in) long and weighs 9.0 to 13.5 g (0.32 to 0.48 oz). The species is sexually dimorphic. Adult males have a bright golden-yellow forecrown of plush feathers that curve forward over the bill and short black plumes on either side of it that project up as "horns". Their plumage otherwise is mostly black with a patch of orange-red on the hindcrown, a patch of golden-yellow on the throat, and entirely yellow primaries, secondaries, and outermost tail feathers. Adult females are mostly olive-green with a yellow-olive throat, belly, and wing linings. They do not have the male's showy forecrown feathers.

The other subspecies of the golden-winged manakin differ from the nominate and each other thus:

- M. c. bellus: male's rear crown patch is red
- M. c. pax: (male) darker yellow on throat, wings, and tail; red or flame orange rear crown and nape; (female) darker yellow throat
- M. c. coronulatus: male's rear crown and nape are reddish brown
- M. c. peruvianus: (male) deeper richer yellow on throat, wings, and tail; darker red rear crown and nape; (female) slightly richer olive green upperparts and more yellowish olive underparts

Both sexes of all subspecies have a dark brown iris, a pinkish gray bill, and purplish pink legs and feet.

== Distribution and habitat ==
The golden-winged manakin has a disjunct distribution. The subspecies are found thus:

- M. c. bellus: western Colombia from the west side of the Western Andes north of Cauca Department east to the west side of the Central Andes
- M. c. pax: east side of Colombia's Eastern Andes from Cundinamarca Department and south on the east side of the Andes in Ecuador to northern Zamora-Chinchipe Province
- M. c. coronulatus: west side of Colombia's Western Andes from Cauca Department south on the west side of the Andes in Ecuador to Loja Province
- M. c. chrysopterus: in Venezuela on east side of the Andes from Táchira and Barinas south and on west side from Mérida south, continuing on both sides of Colombia's eastern Andes to Boyacá Department and the east side of the Central Andes
- M. c. peruvianus: Andes from southern Zamora-Chinchipe south into Peru to Cajamarca Department on the west side and separately in San Martín Department on the east

The golden-winged manakin inhabits wet montane cloudforest, though it will forage in clearings and forest edges. In elevation it ranges between 1,000 and 2,100 m (3,300 and 6,900 ft) in Venezuela, 600 and 2,400 m (2,000 and 7,900 ft) in Colombia, mostly 800 and 2,000 m (2,600 and 6,600 ft) in Ecuador but locally lower in the west, and 1,200 and 2,000 m (3,900 and 6,600 ft) in Peru.

== Behavior ==
=== Movement ===
The golden-winged manakin is a year-round resident.

=== Feeding ===
The golden-winged manakin feeds mostly of small fruits, with those of the Melastomataceae genus Miconia apparently favored, and also feeds on small insects. They typically forage singly and do associate loosely with mixed-species feeding flocks. Often they and a few other species will forage in one tree though not associating with each other. They take fruits while briefly hovering after a short sally from a perch.

=== Breeding ===
The golden-winged manakin's breeding season has not been defined but in western Ecuador appears to include May to July. It may also include October to December there. Males display to females in dispersed leks with advertising calls and performances on mossy logs and buttress roots, of which there may be several in a male's territory. One display includes flying from a perch to a display log, landing, bouncing up, and landing again further along the log. They flash their yellow wings during the bounce. Other displays include a series of postures on the display site involving bobbing, fluffing plumage, bowing, and stamping. The few described nests were small cups made from plant fibers, moss, and spider web and often had moss dangling from the bottom. They were typically placed in a branch fork about 2 m (7 ft) above the ground though one was at least 10 m (33 ft) up. The clutch is two eggs and the female alone incubates. The incubation period, time to fledging, and other details of parental care are not known.

=== Vocalization ===
Male golden-winged manakins make a quiet frog-like "nurrt" call when near their display site. During the "log approach" display they make "a long, whistling seeee-tseet-tseet call ending in a rapid nurrt" as it lands. Both sexes make a thin, high-pitched "tseet" call while foraging.

== Status ==
The IUCN has assessed the golden-winged manakin as being of Least Concern. It has a large range; its population size is not known and is believed to be decreasing. No immediate threats have been identified. The species is considered uncommon in Venezuela and fairly common in Colombia, Ecuador, and Peru. The golden-winged manakin "can be active in relatively new second growth habitat...Nevertheless, the dependence on certain types of mossy logs for key reproductive behaviors, including copulation, suggests that reproductive behaviors might suffer serious negative effects if available habitat consists only of young second-growth or heavily disturbed forest".
