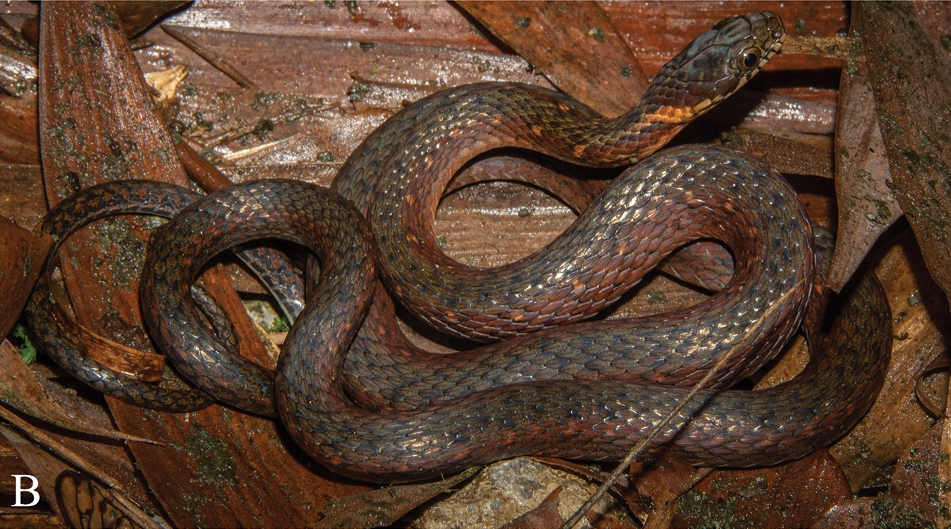
- Male from Mt. Laojun in Sichuan

Scientific classification
- Kingdom: Animalia
- Phylum: Chordata
- Class: Reptilia
- Order: Squamata
- Suborder: Serpentes
- Family: Colubridae
- Genus: Hebius
- Species: H. maximus

Binomial name
- Hebius maximus (Malnate, 1962)

Synonyms
- Amphiesma sauteri maximus Malnate, 1962; Hebius sauteri maximus (Malnate, 1962)

= Hebius maximus =

Species of snake

Hebius maximus, the western China keelback, is a species of snake of the family Colubridae. The snake is endemic to Southwestern China (Chongqing, Sichuan, northwestern Guizhou). Originally described as a subspecies of Amphiesma sauteri (=Hebius sauteri), its validity has been doubted; however, it was revalidated by a 2022 study based on morphological and molecular evidence. The evidence even warranted the recognition of Hebius maximus as a full species.

== Etymology ==
The specific name maximus refers to this taxon having the highest count of ventral scales among what at the time were the three subspecies of H. sauteri.

== Description ==
Hebius maximus is a small to medium-sized snake, reaching 597 mm (23.5 in) in total length. The tail is relatively long, 25–33% of the total length. Dorsal colouration is reddish-brown or grayish brown, while the ventrum is cream white. An ill-defined dark olive dorsal streak scattered with black spots runs from neck to tail.

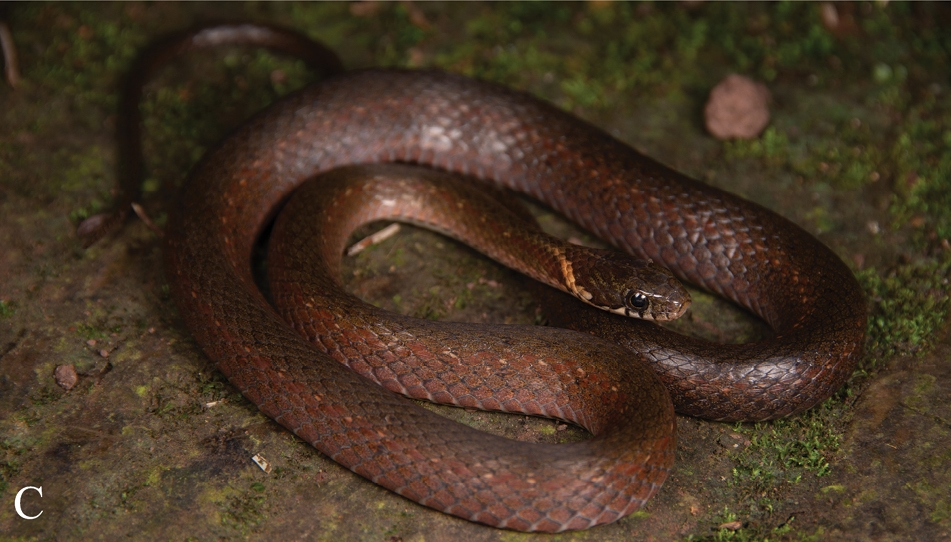
Female from Mount Emei, Sichuan

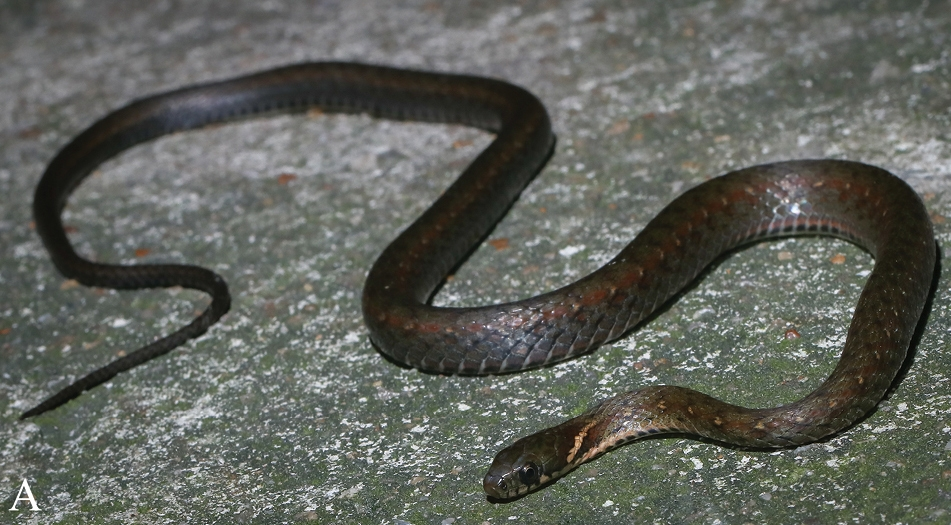
Male from Wujing, Guizhou

== Habitat ==
Hebius maximus occurs in subtropical mountain regions at elevations of about 812–1,200 m (2,664–3,937 ft) above sea level in coniferous forests, large forest clearings, and agricultural areas. It is diurnal, active at dusk. Its prey includes earthworms, slugs, and tadpoles.
