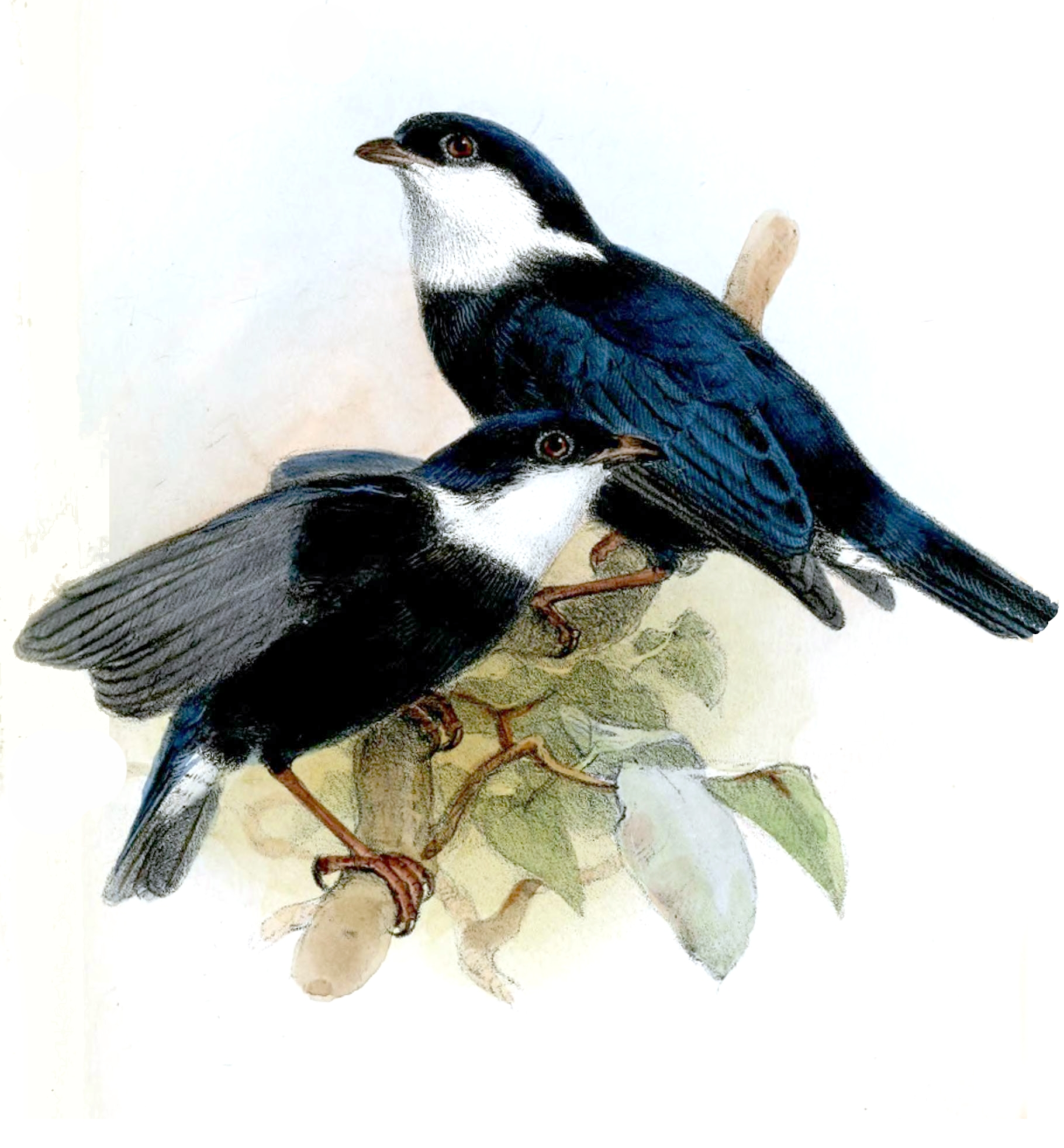

Conservation status
- Least Concern (IUCN 3.1)

Scientific classification
- Kingdom: Animalia
- Phylum: Chordata
- Class: Aves
- Order: Passeriformes
- Family: Pipridae
- Genus: Corapipo
- Species: C. leucorrhoa

Binomial name
- Corapipo leucorrhoa (Sclater, PL, 1863)

= White-bibbed manakin =

Species of bird

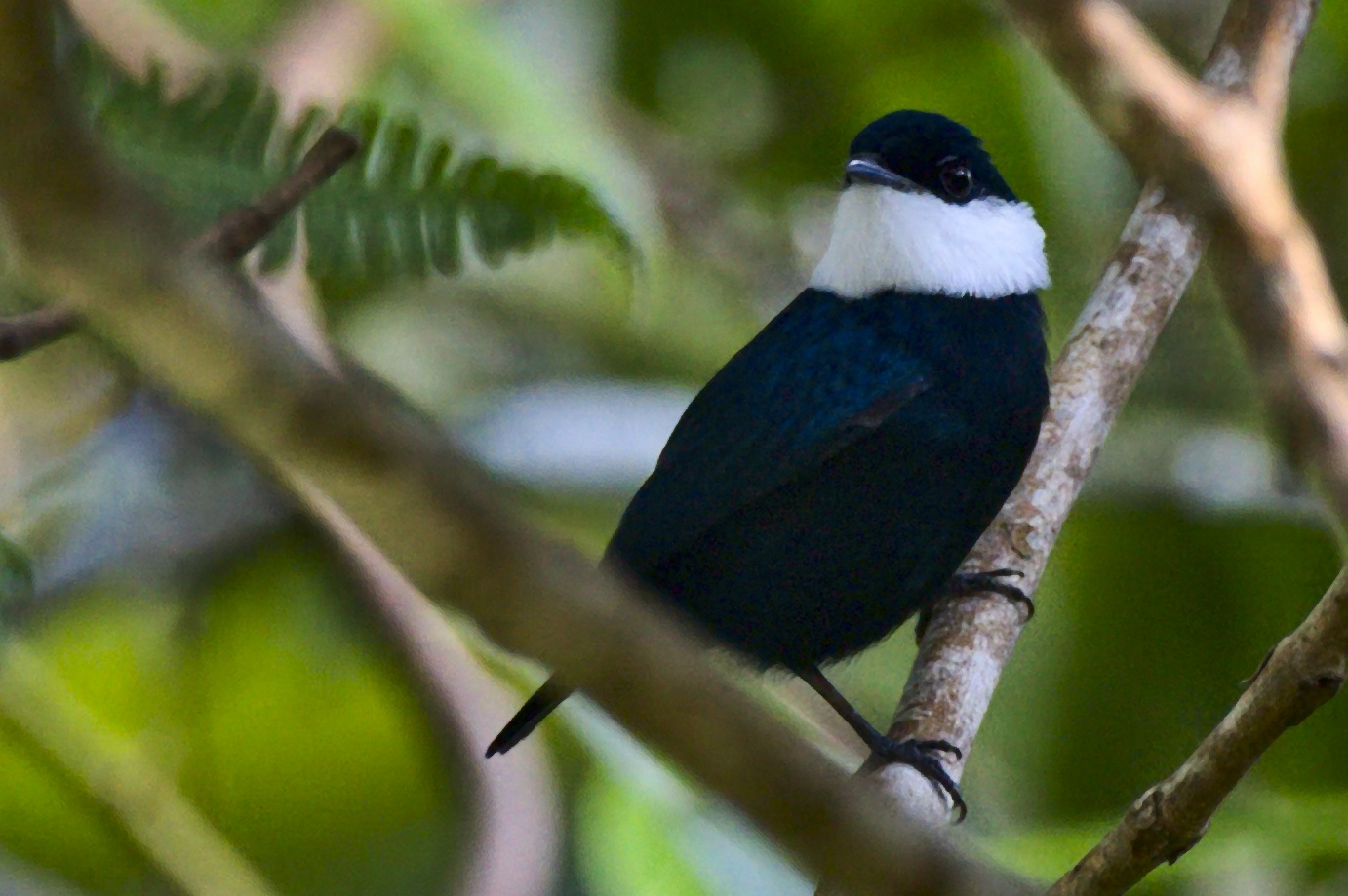
White-bibbed manakin

The white-bibbed manakin (Corapipo leucorrhoa) is a species of bird belonging to the family Pipridae. It is found in Colombia and Venezuela.

== Taxonomy and systematics ==
The white-bibbed manakin was originally described in 1863 as Pipra leucorrhoa. It was later moved to genus Corapipo which Bonaparte had erected in 1854.

The further taxonomy of the white-bibbed manakin is unsettled. The IOC, the Clements taxonomy, and the independent South American Classification Committee treat it as a monotypic species. However, as of December 2025 BirdLife International's Handbook of the Birds of the World (HBW) assigns it two subspecies in addition to the nominate C. l. leucorrhoa and calls it the "white-ruffed manakin". The other three taxonomic systems previously did the same, but now treat them (P. altera altera and P. altera heteroleuca) as subspecies of the separate white-ruffed manakin sensu stricto .

This article follows the monotypic species model.

== Description ==
The white-bibbed manakin is about 10 cm (3.9 in) long and weighs about 12.5 g (0.44 oz). The species is sexually dimorphic. Adult males are mostly glossy blue-black. Their chin, throat, ear coverts, and the sides of their neck are white; the throat and neck feathers are long and form a ruff. Their primaries and the inner webs of their secondaries are dusky. Adult females have olive-green upperparts. Their chin and throat are pale gray to grayish olive green. Their breast, sides, and flanks are pale olive green and their belly and undertail coverts pale yellowish. Both sexes have a black iris, a black bill, and black legs and feet. Immature males resemble adult females with a paler throat.

== Distribution and habitat ==
The white-bibbed manakin has a disjunct distribution. One population is found in the Serranía del Perijá that straddles the Colombia-Venezuela border. Two others are found in the Andes of Venezuela, on the western slope in Mérida and on the eastern slope in Táchira and northwestern Barinas. The western slope range continues into northern Colombia, where the species is found west to Antioquia Department and south in the valley of the Magdalena River to northern Tolima and western Cundinamarca departments. The species inhabits humid to wet primary and gallery forest and also mature secondary forest. In Venezuela it ranges in elevation from near sea level to 1,200 m (3,900 ft) and in Colombia between 200 and 1,500 m (700 and 4,900 ft).

== Behavior ==
=== Movement ===
The white-bibbed manakin is a year-round resident.

=== Feeding ===
The white-bibbed manakin's diet is not known but is assumed to be small fruits and small numbers of insects and spiders. The species is known to forage singly, in pairs, and in small family groups in fruiting trees in clearings and on the forest edge. It sometimes joins mixed-species feeding flocks.

=== Breeding ===
The white-bibbed manakin's breeding season is not known but apparently spans at least from May to October. Males display to females in dispersed leks, usually on or near a fallen log; the display has not been detailed. Nothing else is known about the species' breeding biology.

=== Vocalization ===
Male white-bibbed manakins make "a twangy seet' t't'u-u-u" during display flights. The species' call is "a high, thin, insect-like s-e-e-e-e-e-e-e" that sounds like a slightly blurry trill.

== Status ==
The IUCN follows HBW taxonomy and so has not assessed the white-bibbed manakin separately from the white-ruffed manakin sensu lato. "White-bibbed Manakin inhabits areas where forest destruction and fragmentation suppose a threat to this species. The population has been very seriously reduced in north western South America as a result of forest destruction and fragmentation."
