= Eight-lined keelback =

Conservation status
- Least Concern (IUCN 3.1)

Scientific classification
- Kingdom: Animalia
- Phylum: Chordata
- Class: Reptilia
- Order: Squamata
- Suborder: Serpentes
- Family: Colubridae
- Genus: Hebius
- Species: H. octolineatus

Binomial name
- Hebius octolineatus (Boulenger, 1904)

Synonyms
- Tropidonotus octolineatus; Tropidonotus quadrilineatus; Tropidonotus pleurotaenia; Tropidonotus parallelus var. sublaevis; Natrix septemlineata; Natrix octolineata; Natrix nigroreticulata; Amphiesma octolineata; Amphiesma octolineatum

Species of snake

The eight-lined keelback (Hebius octolineatus) is a species of snake of the family Colubridae. It is endemic to southwestern China.

== Geographic range ==
The snake is found in Yunnan, Sichuan, Guizhou, and Guangxi provinces of China.
