= Hebius septemlineatus =

Scientific classification
- Kingdom: Animalia
- Phylum: Chordata
- Class: Reptilia
- Order: Squamata
- Suborder: Serpentes
- Family: Colubridae
- Genus: Hebius
- Species: H. septemlineatus

Binomial name
- Hebius septemlineatus (Schmidt, 1925)

Synonyms
- Natrix septemlineata Schmidt, 1925

Species of snake

Hebius septemlineatus, the Tengchong keelback snake, is a species of snake of the family Colubridae. It is endemic to western Yunnan, China. The vernacular name refers to its type locality, Tengchong.

Males measure 198–520 mm (7.8–20.5 in) and females 316–408 mm (12.4–16.1 in) in snout–vent length. The tail is 66–177 mm (2.6–7.0 in) and 94–142 mm (3.7–5.6 in) in males and females, respectively.
