= Hebius taronensis =

Conservation status
- Near Threatened (IUCN 3.1)

Scientific classification
- Kingdom: Animalia
- Phylum: Chordata
- Class: Reptilia
- Order: Squamata
- Suborder: Serpentes
- Family: Colubridae
- Genus: Hebius
- Species: H. taronensis

Binomial name
- Hebius taronensis (Smith, 1940)

Synonyms
- Natrix venningi taronensis Smith, 1940; Amphiesma venningi taronensis (Smith, 1940); Paranatrix venningi taronenis (Smith, 1940); Amphiesma taronense (Smith, 1940); Amphiesma taronensis (Smith, 1940); Hebius taronense (Smith, 1940)

Species of snake

Hebius taronensis, the Kachin keelback or Taron keelback, is a species of snake of the family Colubridae. The snake is found in northern Myanmar (northern Kachin State) and Northeast India (Arunachal Pradesh).
