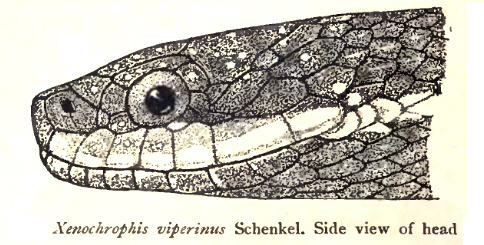

Conservation status
- Data Deficient (IUCN 3.1)

Scientific classification
- Kingdom: Animalia
- Phylum: Chordata
- Class: Reptilia
- Order: Squamata
- Suborder: Serpentes
- Family: Colubridae
- Genus: Hebius
- Species: H. viperinus

Binomial name
- Hebius viperinus (Schenkel-Haas, 1901)

Synonyms
- Xenochrophis viperinus; Amphiesma viperina; Amphiesma viperinum

= Viper-like keelback =

Species of snake

The viper-like keelback (Hebius viperinus) is a species of snake of the family Colubridae.

== Geographic range ==
The snake is found in Indonesia.
