= Hebius petersii =

Conservation status
- Least Concern (IUCN 3.1)

Scientific classification
- Kingdom: Animalia
- Phylum: Chordata
- Class: Reptilia
- Order: Squamata
- Suborder: Serpentes
- Family: Colubridae
- Genus: Hebius
- Species: H. petersii

Binomial name
- Hebius petersii (Boulenger, 1893)

Synonyms
- Tropidonotus maculatus W. Peters, 1871 (nomen praeoccupandum); Tropidonotus petersii Boulenger, 1893 (nomen novum); Natrix petersii (Boulenger, 1893); Amphiesma petersi (Boulenger, 1893)

Species of snake

Hebius petersii, also known commonly as Peters' keelback, is a species of snake in the subfamily Natricinae of the family Colubridae. The species is native to Indonesia and Malaysia, as well as Singapore, where it was once believed to be extinct until it was rediscovered after 64 years in October 2024.

== Etymology ==
The specific name, petersii, is in honor of German herpetologist Wilhelm Peters.
