= Andrea's keelback =

Conservation status
- Data Deficient (IUCN 3.1)

Scientific classification
- Kingdom: Animalia
- Phylum: Chordata
- Class: Reptilia
- Order: Squamata
- Suborder: Serpentes
- Family: Colubridae
- Genus: Hebius
- Species: H. andreae

Binomial name
- Hebius andreae (Ziegler & Le, 2006)

Synonyms
- Amphiesma andreae Ziegler & Le, 2006; Hebius andreae — Guo et al., 2014

Species of snake

Andrea's keelback (Hebius andreae) is a species of nonvenomous colubrid snake endemic to Vietnam.

== Etymology ==
The specific name, andreae, is in honor of Andrea Ziegler, wife of German herpetologist Thomas Ziegler.

== Geographic range ==
H. andreae is found in the central Annamite Range in Vietnam.

== Habitat ==
The preferred natural habitat of H. andreae is forest, at an altitude of 450 m (1,480 ft).

== Discovery ==
Only one specimen of H. andreae has ever been examined and photographed. In 2006, Thomas Ziegler and Le Khac Quyet, captured a male in the area of Phong Nha-Kẻ Bàng National Park whose coloring was distinct enough from other known keelbacks to be described as a newly discovered species. There has been one bite recorded from this species on Bharathi Pochu.

== Reproduction ==
H. andreae is oviparous.
