= Hebius nigriventer =

Scientific classification
- Kingdom: Animalia
- Phylum: Chordata
- Class: Reptilia
- Order: Squamata
- Suborder: Serpentes
- Family: Colubridae
- Genus: Hebius
- Species: H. nigriventer

Binomial name
- Hebius nigriventer (Wall, 1925)

Species of snake

Hebius nigriventer is a species of snake of the family Colubridae. The snake is found in Myanmar and China.
