= Groundwater's keelback =

Conservation status
- Data Deficient (IUCN 3.1)

Scientific classification
- Kingdom: Animalia
- Phylum: Chordata
- Class: Reptilia
- Order: Squamata
- Suborder: Serpentes
- Family: Colubridae
- Genus: Hebius
- Species: H. groundwateri

Binomial name
- Hebius groundwateri (M.A. Smith, 1922)

Synonyms
- Natrix groundwateri M.A. Smith, 1922; Amphiesma groundwateri — Chan-ard et al., 1999; Hebius groundwateri — Guo et al., 2014; Amphiesma groundwateri — Wallach et al., 2014; Hebius groundwateri — David et al., 2021

Species of snake

Groundwater's keelback (Hebius groundwateri) is a species of snake in the family Colubridae. The species is endemic to Thailand.

== Etymology ==
The specific name, groundwateri, is in honor of zoological illustrator Mr. C.L. Groundwater.

== Geographic range ==
H. groundwateri is found in southern Thailand, in Ranong Province.

== Habitat ==
The preferred natural habitat of H. groundwateri is forest.

== Description ==
H. groundwateri may attain a total length of 45 cm (18 in), which includes a tail 16.5 cm (6.5 in) long.

== Reproduction ==
H. groundwateri is oviparous.
