= Hebius bitaeniatus =

Conservation status
- Least Concern (IUCN 3.1)

Scientific classification
- Kingdom: Animalia
- Phylum: Chordata
- Class: Reptilia
- Order: Squamata
- Suborder: Serpentes
- Family: Colubridae
- Genus: Hebius
- Species: H. bitaeniatus

Binomial name
- Hebius bitaeniatus (Wall, 1925)

Synonyms
- Natrix bitaeniata; Amphiesma bitaeniata; Amphiesma bitaeniatum

Species of snake

Hebius bitaeniatus, commonly known as the two-striped keelback or Kutkai keelback, is a species of snake of the family Colubridae. It is found in Southeast and East Asia. Its reproduction is oviparous in nature.

== Geographic range and habitat ==
Hebius bitaeniatum occurs in southern China (Yunnan, Hunan, Guizhou), Myanmar, Thailand, and Vietnam. It inhabits montane rainforest at elevations of 1,829–2,377 m (6,001–7,799 ft) above sea level.
