= Annam keelback =

Conservation status
- Data Deficient (IUCN 3.1)

Scientific classification
- Kingdom: Animalia
- Phylum: Chordata
- Class: Reptilia
- Order: Squamata
- Suborder: Serpentes
- Family: Colubridae
- Genus: Hebius
- Species: H. annamensis

Binomial name
- Hebius annamensis (Bourret, 1934)

Synonyms
- Opisthotropis annamensis; Parahelicops annamensis

Species of snake

The Annam keelback (Hebius annamensis) is a species of semi-aquatic snake in the family Colubridae. It is native to parts of Vietnam and Laos.

== Morphology ==
The Annam keelback is a chestnut, dark brown, or gray-brown snake, sometimes with an iridescent purple hue. It has a cream, ochre, or light brown underbelly, and an orange dorsolateral stripe extending from the posterior eye. It has an elongate body with a distinct oval head and a long snout. The scales are rhomboid and become more keeled towards the caudal region. The eyes are small and black with round pupils. The largest known specimen of H. annamensis measured 79.6 cm in length.

There is little sexual dimorphism evident in the known specimens, though the body of male specimens are somewhat thinner than those of females. Males and females also appear to differ slightly in the number and arrangement of the scales.

H. annamensis is distinguished from morphologically similar species by the combination of its pale underbelly and the number of scale rows at its mid-body (17 in H. annamensis).

== Distribution ==
Specimens of H. annamensis have been collected from Vietnam and Laos. All of the known specimens were collected from montane evergreen forests in close proximity to fast-moving streams.

== Behavior and ecology ==
Little is known about the behavior or ecology of the Annam keelback. At least two of the known specimens were collected at night, suggesting that the species is nocturnal.

== Description and taxonomy ==
Hebius annamensis was described by the French herpetologist René Bourret in 1934 as Parahelicops annamensis based on a specimen collected from Vietnam. The original description was published in volume III of his Notes herpétologiques sur l'Indochine français. The type specimen is held in the Muséum National d'Histoire Naturelle in Paris, France. Paraheliocops was a new genus erected by Bourret with P. annamensis as its sole member.

Kizirian et al. (2018) later placed Annam keelback in the newly resurrected genus Hebius on the basis of genetic analysis. The authors also noted that there was enough sequence divergence between northern and southern specimens to suggest that they may represent different species being catalogued under the same binomial.
