= Vietnam water snake =

Conservation status
- Data Deficient (IUCN 3.1)

Scientific classification
- Kingdom: Animalia
- Phylum: Chordata
- Class: Reptilia
- Order: Squamata
- Suborder: Serpentes
- Family: Colubridae
- Genus: Hebius
- Species: H. chapaensis

Binomial name
- Hebius chapaensis (Bourret, 1934)

Synonyms
- Pararhabdophis chapaensis Bourret, 1934

Species of snake

The Vietnam water snake or Chapa flat-nosed snake (Hebius chapaensis) is a species of colubrid snake. It is found in northern Vietnam and Yunnan, southern China.
