= Pope's keelback =

Conservation status
- Least Concern (IUCN 3.1)

Scientific classification
- Kingdom: Animalia
- Phylum: Chordata
- Class: Reptilia
- Order: Squamata
- Suborder: Serpentes
- Family: Colubridae
- Genus: Hebius
- Species: H. popei

Binomial name
- Hebius popei (Schmidt, 1925)

Synonyms
- Natrix popei Schmidt, 1925; Natrix vibakari popei — Mell, 1931; Amphiesma popei — Malnate, 1960; Hebius popei — Guo et al., 2014

Species of snake

Pope's keelback (Hebius popei) is a species of snake in the family Colubridae. The species is found in Vietnam and southern China.

== Etymology ==
The specific name, popei, is in honor of American herpetologist Clifford H. Pope.

== Geographic range ==
H. popei is found in southern China (including the island of Hainan) and northern Vietnam.

== Habitat ==
The natural habitats of H. popei are mountain and hill streams in forests at elevations of 281–900 m (922–2,953 ft) above sea level.

== Reproduction ==
H. popei is oviparous.
