= Hebius celebicus =

Conservation status
- Near Threatened (IUCN 3.1)

Scientific classification
- Kingdom: Animalia
- Phylum: Chordata
- Class: Reptilia
- Order: Squamata
- Suborder: Serpentes
- Family: Colubridae
- Genus: Hebius
- Species: H. celebicus

Binomial name
- Hebius celebicus (Peters & Doria, 1878)

Species of snake

Hebius celebicus the Sulawesi keelback, is a species of snake of the family Colubridae. The snake is found in Indonesia.
