= Hebius igneus =

Scientific classification
- Kingdom: Animalia
- Phylum: Chordata
- Class: Reptilia
- Order: Squamata
- Suborder: Serpentes
- Family: Colubridae
- Genus: Hebius
- Species: H. igneus

Binomial name
- Hebius igneus David, Vogel, Nguyen, Orlov, Pauwels, Teynie, & Ziegler, 2021

Species of snake

Hebius igneus is a species of snake of the family Colubridae. The snake is found in southwestern China (Yunnan), northern Vietnam, and northern Thailand (Nan province).
