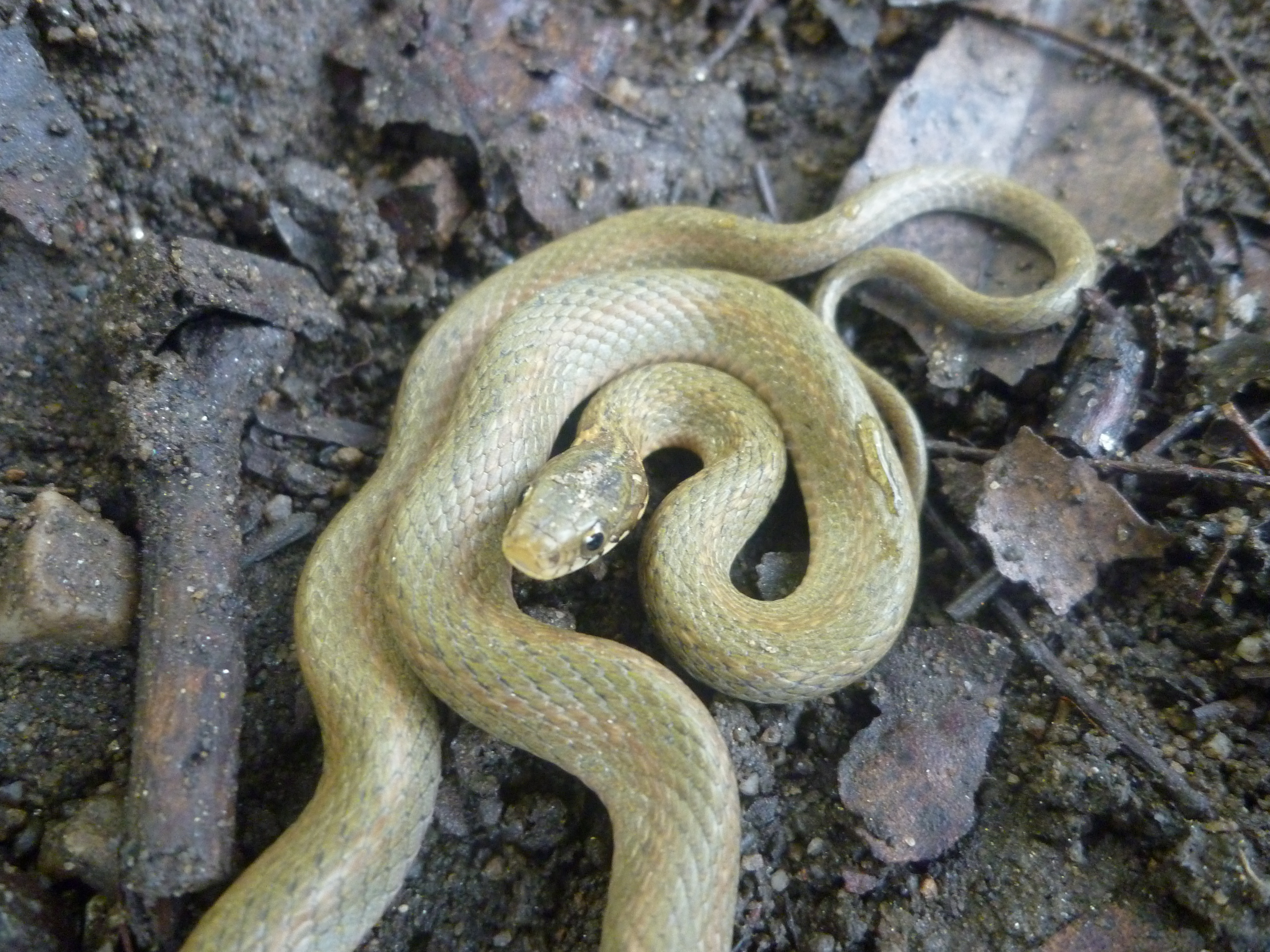

Conservation status
- Least Concern (IUCN 3.1)

Scientific classification
- Kingdom: Animalia
- Phylum: Chordata
- Class: Reptilia
- Order: Squamata
- Suborder: Serpentes
- Family: Colubridae
- Genus: Hebius
- Species: H. vibakari

Binomial name
- Hebius vibakari (H. Boie, 1826)

Synonyms
- Tropidonotus vibakari H. Boie, 1826; Natrix vibakari – Stejneger, 1907; Amphiesma vibakari – Malnate, 1960

= Japanese keelback =

Species of snake

The Japanese keelback (Hebius vibakari), sometimes called the ringed snake or water snake, is a species of colubrid snake, which is endemic to Asia. It was first described in 1826 by Heinrich Boie as Tropidonotus vibakari.

== Geographic range ==
It is found in northeastern China, Japan (Honshu, Kyushu, Shikoku), Korea, and Russia (Amur Oblast, Khabarovsk Krai, Primorsky Krai).

== Description ==
It is a small snake, growing to a maximum total length of 44 cm (17 1/4 in), with a tail 10 cm (3 7/8 in) long.

Dorsally it is olive or reddish brown, with small blackish spots. Some specimens may have a dark olive or blackish vertebral stripe. The upper labials are yellow, with black sutures. On each side of the nape of the neck there is a yellow dark-edged diagonal streak, these two streaks converging posteriorly. Ventrally it is yellow, with a series of brown dots or short lines at the outer ends of the ventral scales.

Dorsal scales strongly keeled (except outer row), arranged in 19 rows at midbody. Ventrals 127–151; anal plate divided; subcaudals divided 59–79.
