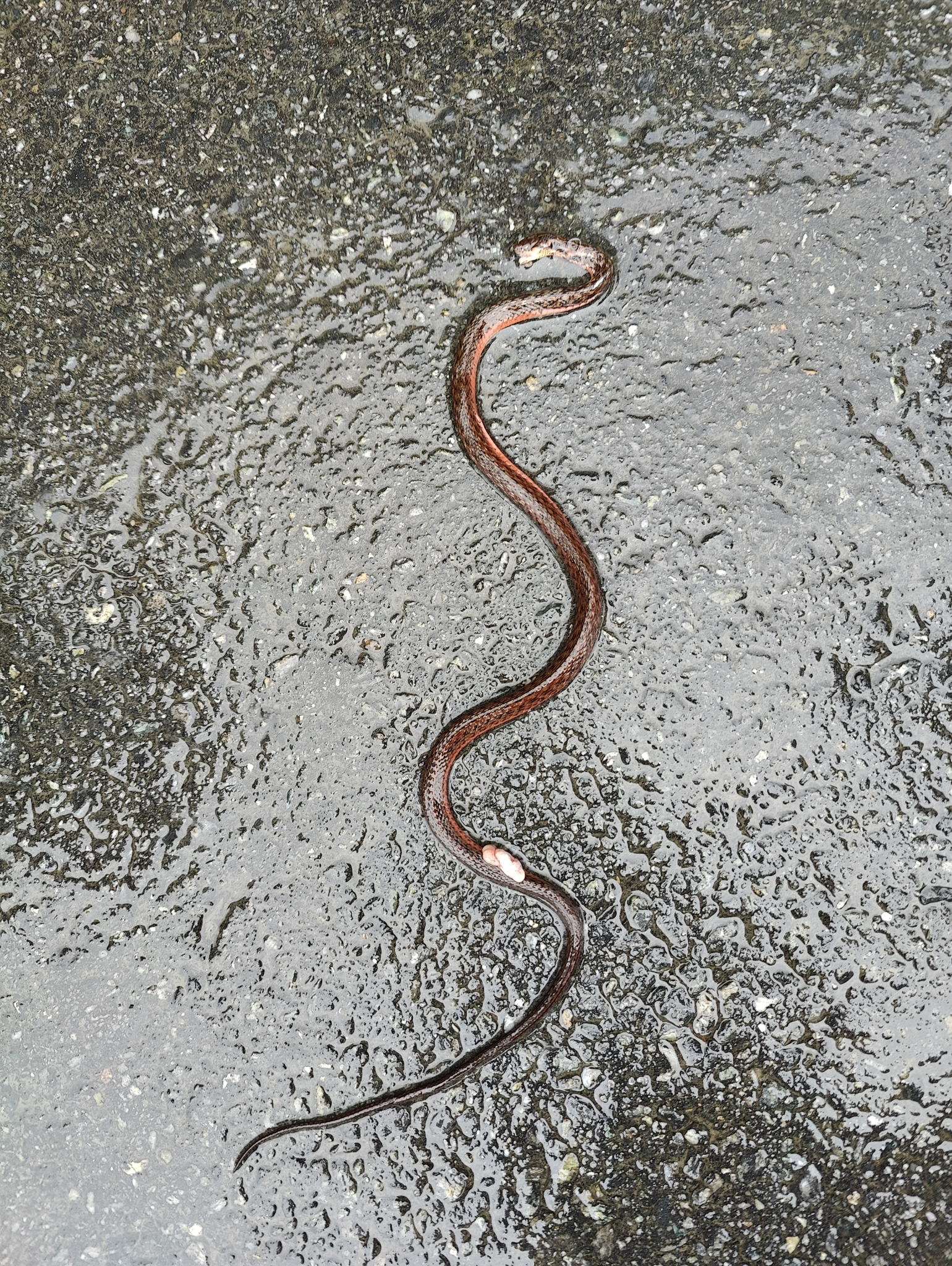

Conservation status
- Least Concern (IUCN 3.1)

Scientific classification
- Kingdom: Animalia
- Phylum: Chordata
- Class: Reptilia
- Order: Squamata
- Suborder: Serpentes
- Family: Colubridae
- Genus: Hebius
- Species: H. clerki

Binomial name
- Hebius clerki (Wall, 1925)

Synonyms
- Natrix clerki Wall, 1925; Natrix parallela M.A. Smith, 1943; Hebius clerki Guo et al., 2014; Amphiesma clerki David et al., 2015

= Hebius clerki =

Species of snake

Hebius clerki, also known commonly as the Yunnan keelback, is a species of snake in the family Colubridae. The species is native to Asia.

== Geographic range ==
H. clerki is found in north-eastern India, northern Myanmar, south-western China (Yunnan), Nepal, and Bhutan.

== Taxonomy ==
Many authors have considered H. clerki to be a synonym of H. parallelus (formerly Amphiesma parallelum), but a 2015 study revalidated H. clerki. It is possible that many records of H. parallelus actually represent H. clerki.

== Habitat ==
H. clerki is a terrestrial snake inhabiting subtropical moist hill forests above 1,000 m (3,300 ft), often close to water.

== Reproduction ==
The mode of reproduction of H. clerki is unknown.
