= Hebius johannis =

Conservation status
- Least Concern (IUCN 3.1)

Scientific classification
- Kingdom: Animalia
- Phylum: Chordata
- Class: Reptilia
- Order: Squamata
- Suborder: Serpentes
- Family: Colubridae
- Genus: Hebius
- Species: H. johannis

Binomial name
- Hebius johannis (Boulenger, 1908)

Synonyms
- Tropidonotus johannis Boulenger, 1908; Natrix johannis — Schmidt, 1927; Amphiesma johannis — Malnate, 1960; Hebius johannis — Guo et al., 2014

Species of snake

Hebius johannis, also known commonly as Johann's keelback, is a species of snake in the subfamily Natricinae of the family Colubridae. The species is endemic to China.

== Etymology ==
The specific name, johannis, is in honor of the Rev. John Graham who sent the first three specimens of this species to Boulenger.

== Geographic range ==
H. johannis is found in Southwestern China in the inland provinces of Guizhou, Sichuan, and Yunnan.

== Habitat ==
The preferred natural habitat of H. johannis is the vicinity of rivers and streams in forest and montane grassland, at altitudes of 1,200–2,750 m (3,940–9,020 ft), but it has also been found in artificial habitats such as rice paddies.

== Diet ==
H. johannis preys upon fishes.

== Reproduction ==
H. johannis is oviparous.
