= Hebius weixiensis =

Scientific classification
- Kingdom: Animalia
- Phylum: Chordata
- Class: Reptilia
- Order: Squamata
- Suborder: Serpentes
- Family: Colubridae
- Genus: Hebius
- Species: H. weixiensis

Binomial name
- Hebius weixiensis Hou, Yuan, Wei, Guo & Che

Species of snake

Hebius weixiensis, the Weixi keelback snake, is a species of snake of the family Colubridae. It is endemic to China and known from around Lijiang in Yunnan. The specific name weixiensis refers to its type locality, Weixi County.

Males measure 290–475 mm (11.4–18.7 in) and females 287–520 mm (11.3–20.5 in) in snout–vent length. The tail is 60–163 mm (2.4–6.4 in) and 88–160 mm (3.5–6.3 in) in males and females, respectively.
