= Hebius kerinciensis =

Conservation status
- Data Deficient (IUCN 3.1)

Scientific classification
- Kingdom: Animalia
- Phylum: Chordata
- Class: Reptilia
- Order: Squamata
- Suborder: Serpentes
- Family: Colubridae
- Genus: Hebius
- Species: H. kerinciensis

Binomial name
- Hebius kerinciensis (David & Das, 2003)

Synonyms
- Amphiesma kerinciense David & Das, 2003; Hebius kerinciense (David & Das, 2003)

Species of snake

Hebius kerinciensis, also known as the Gunung Kerinchi keelback, is a species of snake of the family Colubridae. The snake is only known from the Kerinci Seblat National Park, Sumatra (Indonesia), from the slope of the eponymous Mount Kerinchi (=Gunung Kerinchi). The species is only known from a single specimen that was collected in the submontane forest in a mountain stream. The specimen was feeding on tadpoles.
