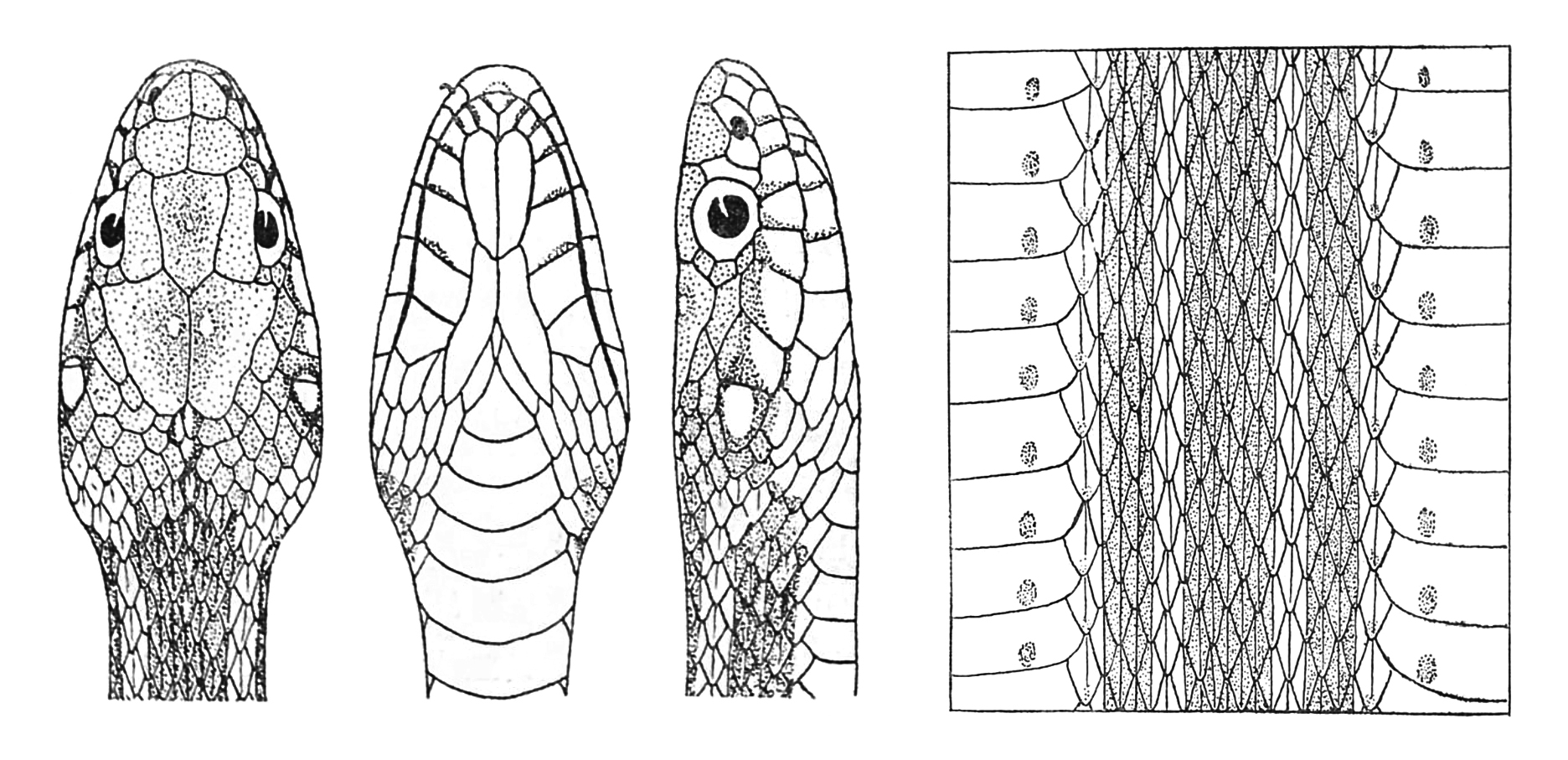
- Scalation of the holotype

Conservation status
- Vulnerable (IUCN 3.1)

Scientific classification
- Kingdom: Animalia
- Phylum: Chordata
- Class: Reptilia
- Order: Squamata
- Suborder: Serpentes
- Family: Colubridae
- Genus: Hebius
- Species: H. miyajimae

Binomial name
- Hebius miyajimae (Maki, 1931)

Synonyms
- Natrix miyajimae; Amphiesma miyajimae

= Maki's keelback =

Species of snake

Maki's keelback (Hebius miyajimae) is a small snake up to 60 cm in total length. It inhabits low montane environments in the central and northern part of Taiwan; it is considered a forest specialist. It is endemic to Taiwan. There is also an unverified record from Hainan, China. Amphiesma miyajimae is threatened in parts of its range through habitat degradation and road kills.
