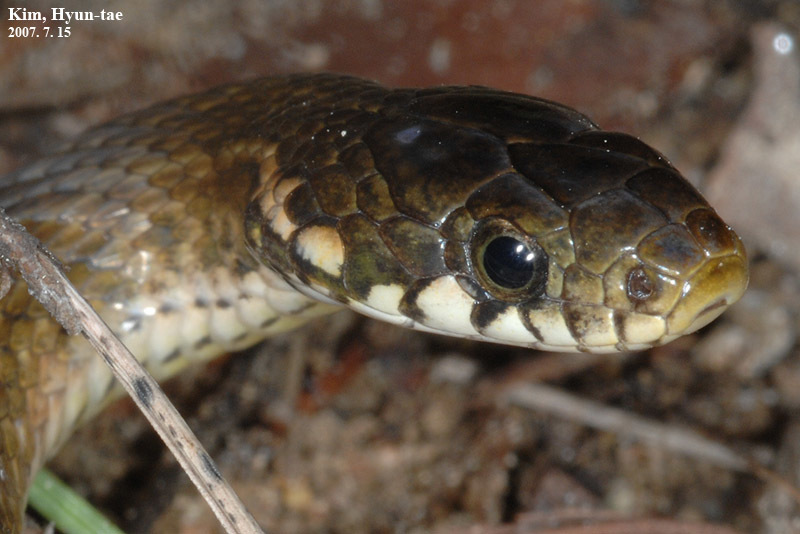
- Japanese keelback (Hebius vibakari)

Scientific classification
- Kingdom: Animalia
- Phylum: Chordata
- Class: Reptilia
- Order: Squamata
- Suborder: Serpentes
- Family: Colubridae
- Subfamily: Natricinae
- Genus: Hebius; Thompson, 1913

= Hebius =

Genus of snakes

Hebius is a genus of snakes in the family Colubridae.

== Geographic range ==
The genus Hebius is endemic to Asia.

== Taxonomy ==
All of the member species of the genus Hebius were formerly placed in the genus Amphiesma, but in 2014 Guo et al. placed most species of Amphiesma in the genus Hebius. They placed other species in the genus Herpetoreas, leaving Amphiesma a monotypic taxon containing only the species Amphiesma stolatum.

== Species ==
The following 53 species are recognized as being valid.

- Hebius andreae (Ziegler & Quyet, 2006) – Andrea’s keelback
- Hebius annamensis Bourret, 1934 – Annam keelback
- Hebius arquus (David & G. Vogel, 2010)
- Hebius atemporalis (Bourret, 1934) – Tonkin keelback
- Hebius bitaeniatus (Wall, 1925) – Kutkai keelback
- Hebius boulengeri (Gressitt, 1937) – Tai-yong keelback, Boulenger’s keelback
- Hebius celebicus (W. Peters & Doria, 1878) – Sulawesi keelback
- Hebius chapaensis Bourret, 1934 – Vietnam water snake
- Hebius clerki (Wall, 1925) – Yunnan keelback
- Hebius concelarus (Malnate, 1963)
- Hebius craspedogaster (Boulenger, 1899) – Kuatun keelback
- Hebius deschauenseei (Taylor, 1934) – northern keelback, Deschauensee’s keelback
- Hebius flavifrons (Boulenger, 1887) – Sabah keelback
- Hebius frenatus (Dunn, 1923) – bridled keelback
- Hebius groundwateri (M.A. Smith, 1922) – Groundwater's keelback
- Hebius igneus David, G. Vogel, T.Q. Nguyen, Orlov, Pauwels, Teynié & Ziegler, 2021
- Hebius inas (Laidlaw, 1901) – Malayan mountain keelback
- Hebius ishigakiensis (Malnate & Munsterman, 1960) – Yaeyama keelback
- Hebius johannis (Boulenger, 1908) – Johann's keelback
- Hebius kerinciensis (David & Das, 2003)
- Hebius khasiensis (Boulenger, 1890) – Khasi Hills keelback, Khasi keelback
- Hebius lacrima Purkayastha & David, 2019 – crying keelback
- Hebius leucomystax (David, Bain, T.Q. Nguyen, Orlov, G. Vogel, Thanh & Ziegler, 2007) – white-lipped keelback
- Hebius malnatei Li et al., 2026
- Hebius maximus Malnate, 1962 – western China keelback
- Hebius metusia (Inger, E. Zhao, Shaffer & G. Wu, 1990) – Wa Shan keelback
- Hebius miyajimae (Maki, 1931) – Maki's keelback
- Hebius modestus (Günther, 1875) – modest keelback
- Hebius nigriventer (Wall, 1925)
- Hebius octolineatus (Boulenger, 1904) – eight-lined keelback
- Hebius optatus (Hu & E. Zhao, 1966) – Mount Omei keelback
- Hebius parallelus (Boulenger, 1890) – Yunnan keelback
- Hebius petersii (Boulenger, 1893) – Peters's keelback
- Hebius popei (Schmidt, 1925) – Pope's keelback
- Hebius pryeri (Boulenger, 1887) – Pryer's keelback
- Hebius sanguineus (Smedley, 1931) – Cameron Highlands keelback
- Hebius sangzhiensis Zhou et al., 2019 – Sangzhi keelback
- Hebius sarasinorum (Boulenger, 1896) – Sarasin’s keelback
- Hebius sarawacensis (Günther, 1872) – Sarawak keelback
- Hebius sauteri (Boulenger, 1909) – Kosempo keelback
- Hebius septemlineatus (Schmidt, 1925) – Tengchong keelback
- Hebius taronensis (M.A. Smith, 1940) – Kachin keelback
- Hebius terrakarenorum Hauser, Smits, & David, 2022
- Hebius venningi (Wall, 1910) – Chin Hills keelback
- Hebius vibakari (H. Boie, 1826) – Japanese keelback
- Hebius viperinus (Schenkel, 1901)
- Hebius weixiensis Hou, Yuan, Wei, G. Zhao, G. Liu, Y. Wu, Shen, Chen, Guo & Che, 2021 – Weixi keelback
- Hebius yanbianensis Q. Liu, Zhong, Wang, Y. Liu & Guo, 2018) – Yanbian keelback
- Hebius youjiangensis Yang, Xu, Wu, Gong, Huang & Huang, 2023
- Hebius citrinoventer Xu, Yang, Ouyang, Huang & Peng, 2024 – Yingjiang keelback
- Hebius jingdongensis Ma, Shi, Ayi & Jiang, 2023 – Jingdong keelback
- Hebius gilhodesi Bohra, Nguyen, Vogel, Lalremsanga, Biakzuala, Das, Warjri, Thongni, Poyarkov & Purkayastha, 2025 – Bhamo keelback
- Hebius shantianfangi Liu, Wang, Hou, Zhang, Wang, Zong, Zhou, Rao, David & Vogel, 2025 – Mengla keelback
- Hebius ngoclinhensis Le, Phan, T. L. Nguyen, Murphy, Lam, S. N. Nguyen & Che, 2026 – Ngoc Linh keelback

Nota bene: A binomial authority in parentheses indicates that the species was originally described in a genus other than Hebius.
