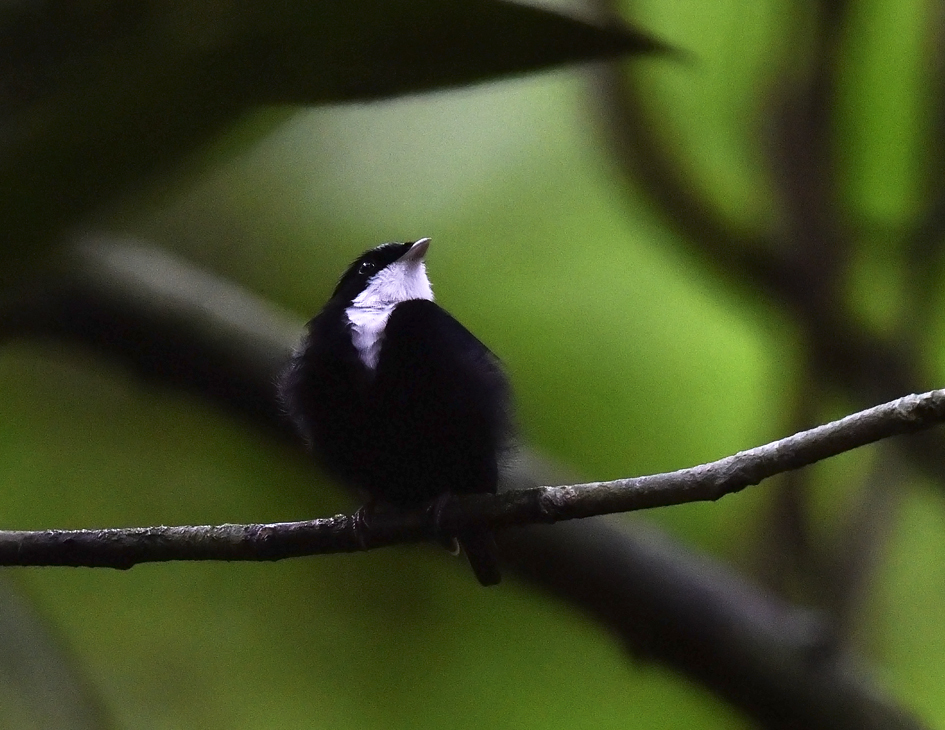

Conservation status
- Least Concern (IUCN 3.1)

Scientific classification
- Kingdom: Animalia
- Phylum: Chordata
- Class: Aves
- Order: Passeriformes
- Family: Pipridae
- Genus: Corapipo
- Species: C. gutturalis

Binomial name
- Corapipo gutturalis (Linnaeus, 1766)

Synonyms
- Pipra gutturalis Linnaeus, 1766

= White-throated manakin =

Species of bird

The white-throated manakin (Corapipo gutturalis) is a species of bird in the family Pipridae. It is found in Brazil, French Guiana, Guyana, Suriname, and Venezuela.

== Taxonomy and systematics ==
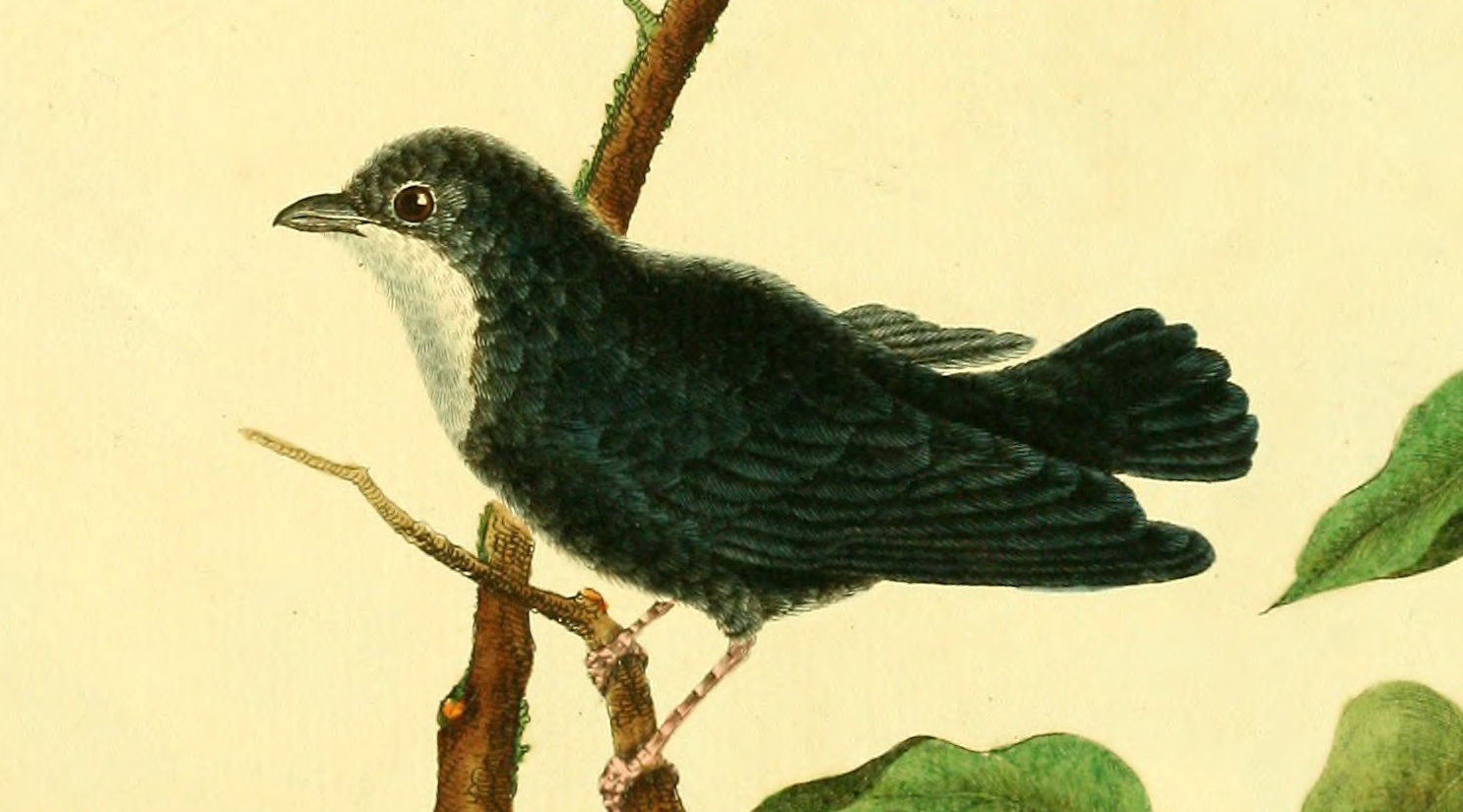
From Planches enluminées d'histoire naturelle (1765)

In 1760 the French zoologist Mathurin Jacques Brisson included a description of the white-throated manakin in his Ornithologie. He used the French name Le manakin à gorge blanche and the Latin Manacus gutture albo. Although Brisson coined Latin names, these do not conform to the binomial system and are not recognized by the International Commission on Zoological Nomenclature. When in 1766 the Swedish naturalist Carl Linnaeus updated his Systema Naturae for the twelfth edition, he added 240 species that had been previously described by Brisson. One of these was the white-throated manakin. Linnaeus included a brief description, coined the binomial name Pipra gutturalis and cited Brisson's work. The specific name gutturalis is Medieval Latin for "of the thoat". This species is now placed in the genus Corapipo that was introduced by the French naturalist Charles Lucien Bonaparte in 1854.

The white-throated manakin is monotypic.

== Description ==
The white-throated manakin is 8.5 to 9.5 cm (3.3 to 3.7 in) long and weighs about 8 to 9 g (0.28 to 0.32 oz). The species is sexually dimorphic. Adult males are mostly glossy blue-black. Their chin, throat, and upper breast are white; on the throat the white forms a downward point. The inner webs of their inner primaries are also white and show as a patch in flight. Adult females have dull olive upperparts and mostly grayish white underparts. Both sexes have a dark iris and a grayish horn to pinkish bill. Males have purplish legs and feet; females' are lead-gray to grayish. Immature males resemble adult females with a white throat.

== Distribution and habitat ==
The white-throated manakin ranges from Venezuela east to the Atlantic. In Venezuela it is found in northern Amazonas and from northwestern Bolívar east, locally through northern Bolívar and more contiguously through southern Amazonas. its range continues east through the Guianas and in Brazil north of the Amazon across northern Roraima and eastern Amazonas to the Atlantic in Amapá. The species primarily inhabits the interior of humid forest, usually that on somewhat hilly terrain, and sometimes is found at the forest edges. In elevation it ranges between 200 and 1,100 m (700 and 3,600 ft) in Venezuela and from sea level to 1,100 m (3,600 ft) in Brazil.

== Behavior ==
=== Movement ===
The white-throated manakin is a year-round resident.

=== Feeding ===
The white-throated manakin feeds on small fruits and insects; fruits of Melastomataceae appear to be favored. It forages up into the forest's mid-story and takes fruits and insects with sallies from a perch. It regularly joins mixed-species feeding flocks.

=== Breeding ===
The white-throated manakin's breeding season has not been defined but includes October in French Guiana. Males make a complex display for females at somewhat separated "exploded" leks. The display often centers around a large fallen log and includes flights between it and a perch, bouncing along the log, and a spiral upward flight with a drop to the log. The species' nest is a small cup with moss on its outside and lined with fungal rhizomorphs and is typically placed in a branch fork and held with spider web. The clutch is believed to be two eggs. Nothing else is known about the species' breeding biology.

=== Vocal and non-vocal sounds ===
The male white-throated manakin's "advertising call" is "seeu-see-ee-ee-ee". During display flights in makes "2–10 high seee notes" followed by a "pop" with the wings on landing and "a complex tickee-yeah" when bouncing. Both sexes give "high, thin seeu-see and chip notes".

== Status ==
The IUCN has assessed the white-throated manakin as being of Least Concern. It has a large range; its population size is not known and is believed to be stable. No immediate threats have been identified. It is considered uncommon to locally fairly common in most of Venezuela but "spotty" in Amazonas. It is rare to uncommon in Brazil.
