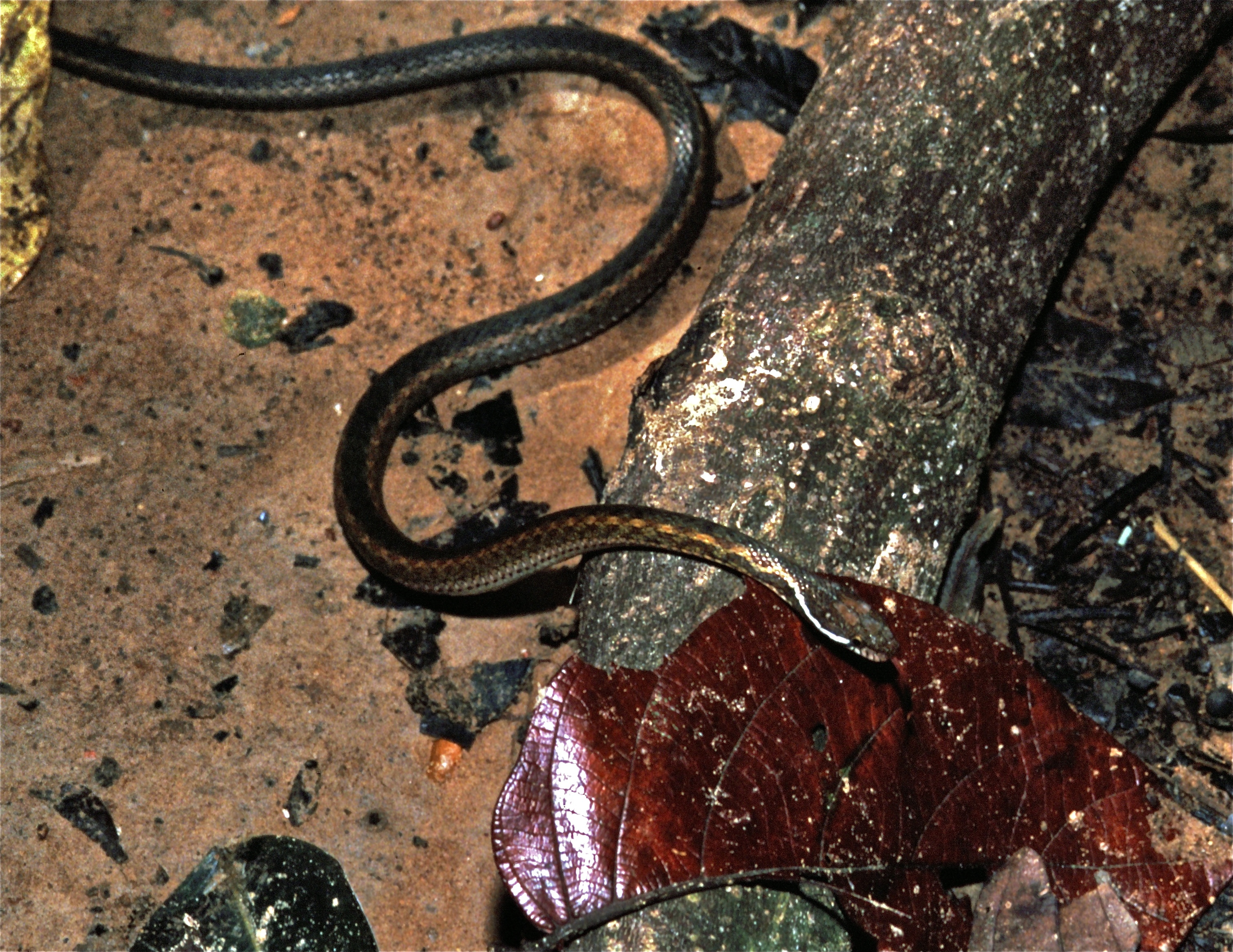

Conservation status
- Least Concern (IUCN 3.1)

Scientific classification
- Kingdom: Animalia
- Phylum: Chordata
- Class: Reptilia
- Order: Squamata
- Suborder: Serpentes
- Family: Colubridae
- Genus: Hebius
- Species: H. khasiensis

Binomial name
- Hebius khasiensis (Boulenger, 1890)

Synonyms
- Tropidonotus khasiensis Boulenger, 1890; Natrix khasiensis – M.A. Smith, 1943; Amphiesma khasiensis – Malnate, 1960; Amphiesma khasiense – Ziegler et al., 2006

= Hebius khasiensis =

Species of snake

Hebius khasiensis, commonly known as the Khasi Hills keelback or Khasi keelback, is a species of colubrid snake endemic to southeastern Asia.

== Geographic range ==
It is found in parts of southern China (Tibet, Yunnan), eastern India (Assam), Thailand, Laos, Myanmar, Cambodia, and Vietnam.

== Description ==
It is a reddish-brown snake with a white transverse bar running across the supralabial scales.

The dorsal scales are in 19 rows, rather strongly keeled, except for the smooth outer row. The ventrals number 150–154, the subcaudals 80–100. The anal plate is divided.

Adults are about 60 cm (23½ in.) total length, of which about 19 cm (7½ in.) is tail.

== Diet ==
The Khasi Hills keelback's nutritional intake consists primarily of toads.

== Photos ==
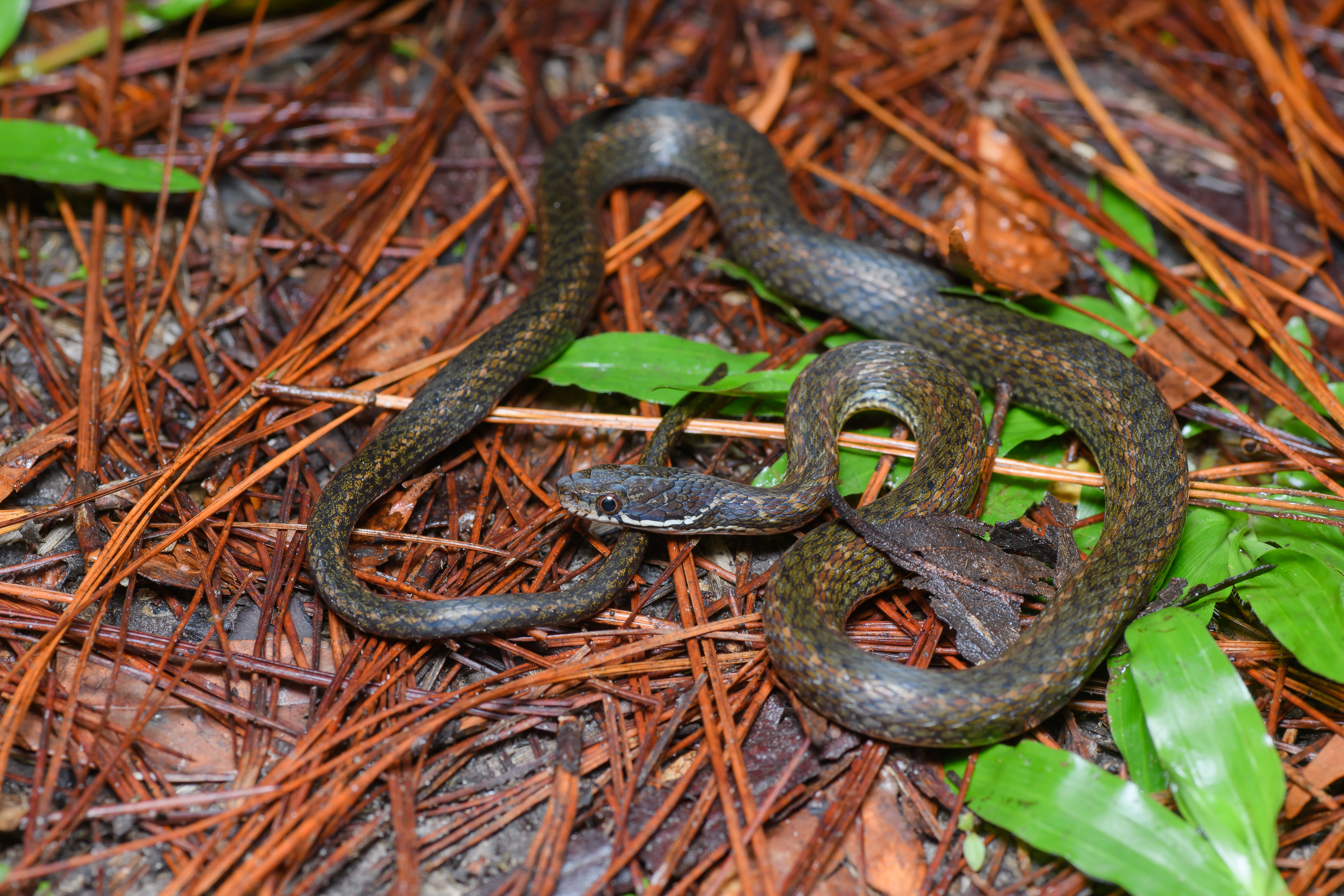
Hebius khasiensis, Khasi Hills keelback - Phu Kradueng National Park
