= Hebius arquus =

Conservation status
- Data Deficient (IUCN 3.1)

Scientific classification
- Kingdom: Animalia
- Phylum: Chordata
- Class: Reptilia
- Order: Squamata
- Suborder: Serpentes
- Family: Colubridae
- Genus: Hebius
- Species: H. arquus

Binomial name
- Hebius arquus (David & Vogel, 2010)

Synonyms
- Amphiesma arquus David & Vogel, 2010

Species of snake

Hebius arquus is a species of snake of the family Colubridae. It is only known from a single specimen that probably originated from West Kalimantan (Indonesian Borneo). The specimen was deposited by Franz Steindachner in 1878.
