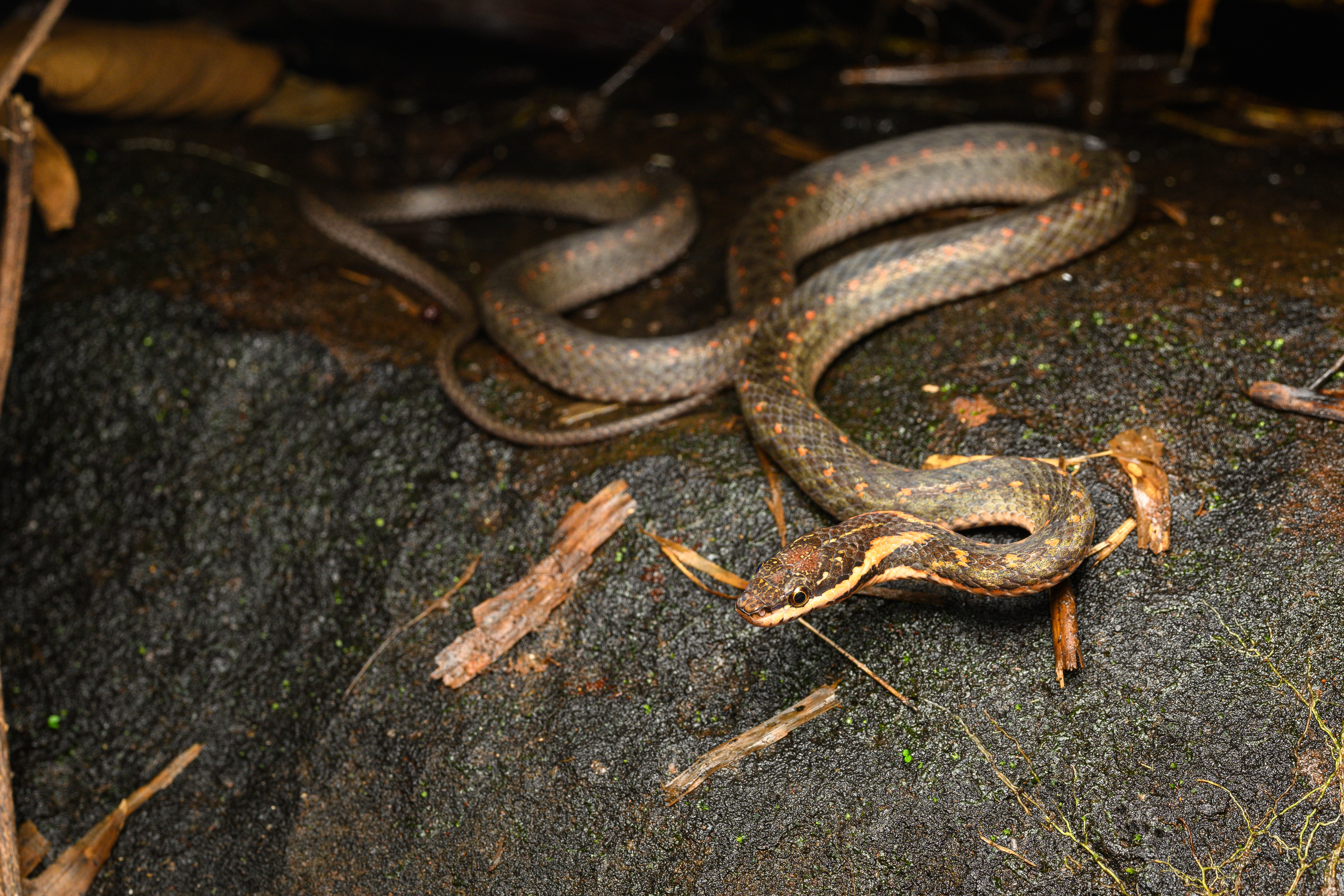
- White-lipped keelback, Hebius leucomystax from Phu Wua Wildlife Sanctuary

Conservation status
- Least Concern (IUCN 3.1)

Scientific classification
- Kingdom: Animalia
- Phylum: Chordata
- Class: Reptilia
- Order: Squamata
- Suborder: Serpentes
- Family: Colubridae
- Genus: Hebius
- Species: H. leucomystax

Binomial name
- Hebius leucomystax (David et al., 2007)

Synonyms
- Amphiesma leucomystax

= White-lipped keelback =

Species of snake

The white-lipped keelback (Hebius leucomystax) is a species of nonvenomous natricine snake found in central Vietnam, Cambodia, and Laos.

== Etymology ==
The specific name, leucomystax, is Greek for "white mustache".

== Biology ==
This snake, though primarily an upland species, is associated with both lowland and montane evergreen monsoon forests. It can be found near streams in mixed dipterocarp and pine forests. More rarely, it has been found in secondary forest. Its diet includes frogs and other small animals.

== Description ==
They grow to 406 mm (16.0 in) in snout–vent length and 595 mm (23.4 in) in total length. It has a beautiful yellow-white stripe that sweeps along its head, and red dots cover its body.
