= Hebius optatus =

Scientific classification
- Kingdom: Animalia
- Phylum: Chordata
- Class: Reptilia
- Order: Squamata
- Suborder: Serpentes
- Family: Colubridae
- Genus: Hebius
- Species: H. optatus

Binomial name
- Hebius optatus (Hu & Zhao, 1966)

Synonyms
- Natrix optata Hu & Zhao, 1966; Amphiesma optata (Hu & Zhao, 1966); Amphiesma optatum (Hu & Zhao, 1966); Hebius optatum (Hu & Zhao, 1966)

Species of snake

Hebius optatus, the Mount Omei keelback, is a species of snake of the family Colubridae. The snake is found in Vietnam and southwestern China.
