= Hebius atemporalis =

Conservation status
- Data Deficient (IUCN 3.1)

Scientific classification
- Kingdom: Animalia
- Phylum: Chordata
- Class: Reptilia
- Order: Squamata
- Suborder: Serpentes
- Family: Colubridae
- Genus: Hebius
- Species: H. atemporalis

Binomial name
- Hebius atemporalis (Bourret, 1934)

Synonyms
- Natrix atemporalis; Amphiesma atemporalis; Amphiesma atemporale

Species of snake

Hebius atemporalis is a species of snake of the family Colubridae. It is also known as the mountain keelback or Tonkin keelback.

== Geographic range ==
The snake is found in northern Vietnam, Laos, and southern China including Hong Kong.
