= Hebius sanguineus =

Scientific classification
- Kingdom: Animalia
- Phylum: Chordata
- Class: Reptilia
- Order: Squamata
- Suborder: Serpentes
- Family: Colubridae
- Genus: Hebius
- Species: H. sanguineus

Binomial name
- Hebius sanguineus (Smedley, 1932)

Species of snake

Hebius sanguineus, the Cameron Highlands keelback, is a species of snake of the family Colubridae. The snake is found in Malaysia.
