= Hebius concelarus =

Scientific classification
- Kingdom: Animalia
- Phylum: Chordata
- Class: Reptilia
- Order: Squamata
- Suborder: Serpentes
- Family: Colubridae
- Genus: Hebius
- Species: H. concelarus

Binomial name
- Hebius concelarus (Malnate, 1963)

Species of snake

Hebius concelarus is a species of snake of the family Colubridae. The snake is found on the Ryukyu Islands.
