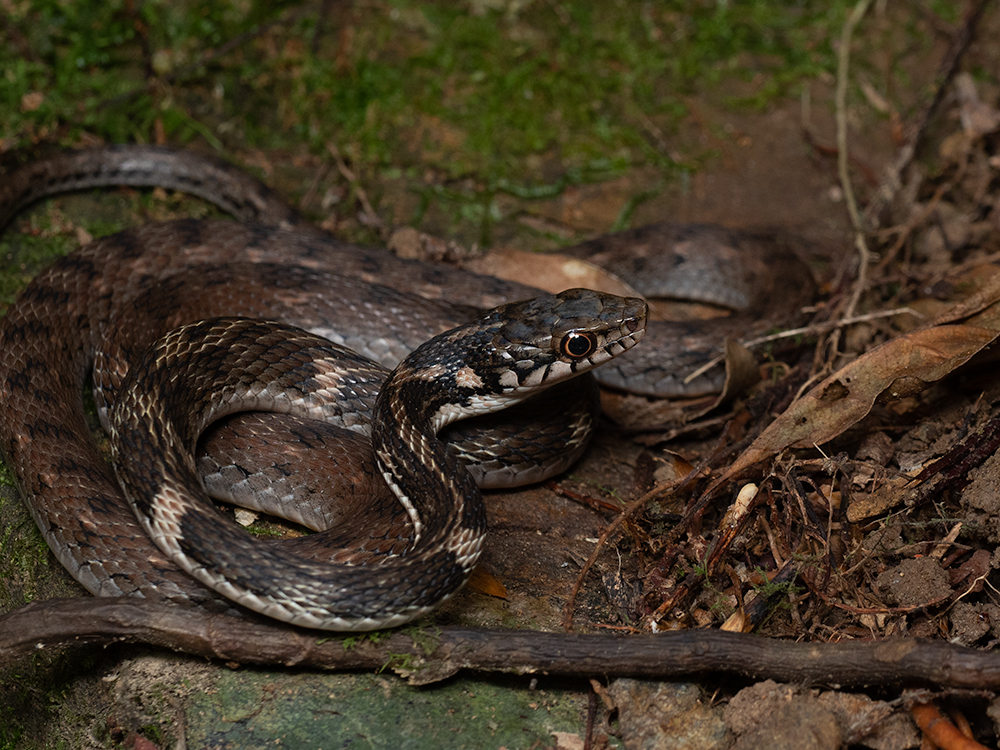

Conservation status
- Least Concern (IUCN 3.1)

Scientific classification
- Kingdom: Animalia
- Phylum: Chordata
- Class: Reptilia
- Order: Squamata
- Suborder: Serpentes
- Family: Colubridae
- Genus: Hebius
- Species: H. pryeri

Binomial name
- Hebius pryeri (Boulenger, 1887)

= Hebius pryeri =

Species of snake

Hebius pryeri, Pryer's keelback, is a species of snake of the family Colubridae. The snake is found on the Ryukyu Islands. Tortoise tick larvae (of the species Amblyomma geoemydae) have been recorded from this species.
