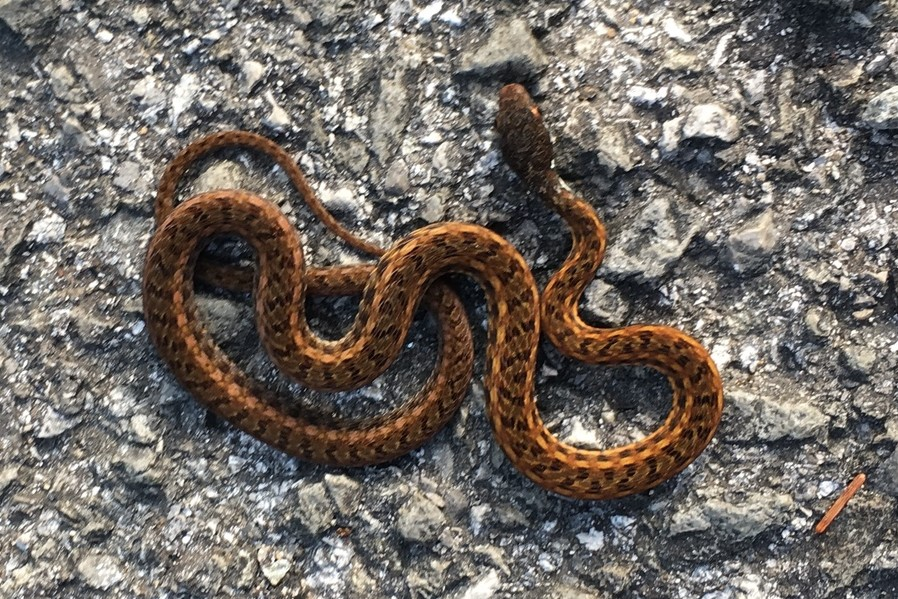

Conservation status
- Least Concern (IUCN 3.1)

Scientific classification
- Kingdom: Animalia
- Phylum: Chordata
- Class: Reptilia
- Order: Squamata
- Suborder: Serpentes
- Family: Colubridae
- Genus: Hebius
- Species: H. sarawacensis

Binomial name
- Hebius sarawacensis (Günther, 1872)

Synonyms
- Tropidonotus sarawacensis Günther, 1872; Amphiesma sarawacense (Günther, 1872); Hebius sarawacense (Günther, 1872)

= Hebius sarawacensis =

Species of snake

Hebius sarawacensis, also known as the Sarawak keelback, is a species of snake of the family Colubridae. The snake is found in Borneo (Sabah and Sarawak, Malaysia; Brunei; Kalimantan, Indonesia) and in southern Malay Peninsula.
