= Hebius sangzhiensis =

Scientific classification
- Kingdom: Animalia
- Phylum: Chordata
- Class: Reptilia
- Order: Squamata
- Suborder: Serpentes
- Family: Colubridae
- Genus: Hebius
- Species: H. sangzhiensis

Binomial name
- Hebius sangzhiensis Zhou, Qi, Lu, Lyu, Wang, Li, & Ma, 2019

Species of snake

Hebius sangzhiensis, the Sangzhi keelback snake, is a species of snake of the family Colubridae. It is endemic to Hunan, South Central China. The specific name sangzhiensis refers to its type locality, Sangzhi County.
