= Hebius frenatus =

Conservation status
- Data Deficient (IUCN 3.1)

Scientific classification
- Kingdom: Animalia
- Phylum: Chordata
- Class: Reptilia
- Order: Squamata
- Suborder: Serpentes
- Family: Colubridae
- Genus: Hebius
- Species: H. frenatus

Binomial name
- Hebius frenatus (Dunn, 1923)

Synonyms
- Natrix frenata Dunn, 1923; Amphiesma frenata (Dunn, 1923); Amphiesma frenatum (Dunn, 1923); Hebius frenatum (Dunn, 1923)

Species of snake

Hebius frenatus, the bridled keelback, is a species of snake of the family Colubridae. The snake is endemic to Borneo with records from Sarawak (Malaysia) and Indonesia.
