= Hebius yanbianensis =

Scientific classification
- Kingdom: Animalia
- Phylum: Chordata
- Class: Reptilia
- Order: Squamata
- Suborder: Serpentes
- Family: Colubridae
- Genus: Hebius
- Species: H. yanbianensis

Binomial name
- Hebius yanbianensis Liu, Zhong, Wang, Liu, & Guo, 2018

Species of snake

Hebius yanbianensis, the Yanbian keelback, is a species of snake of the family Colubridae. It is endemic to China and known from Sichuan and Yunnan.
