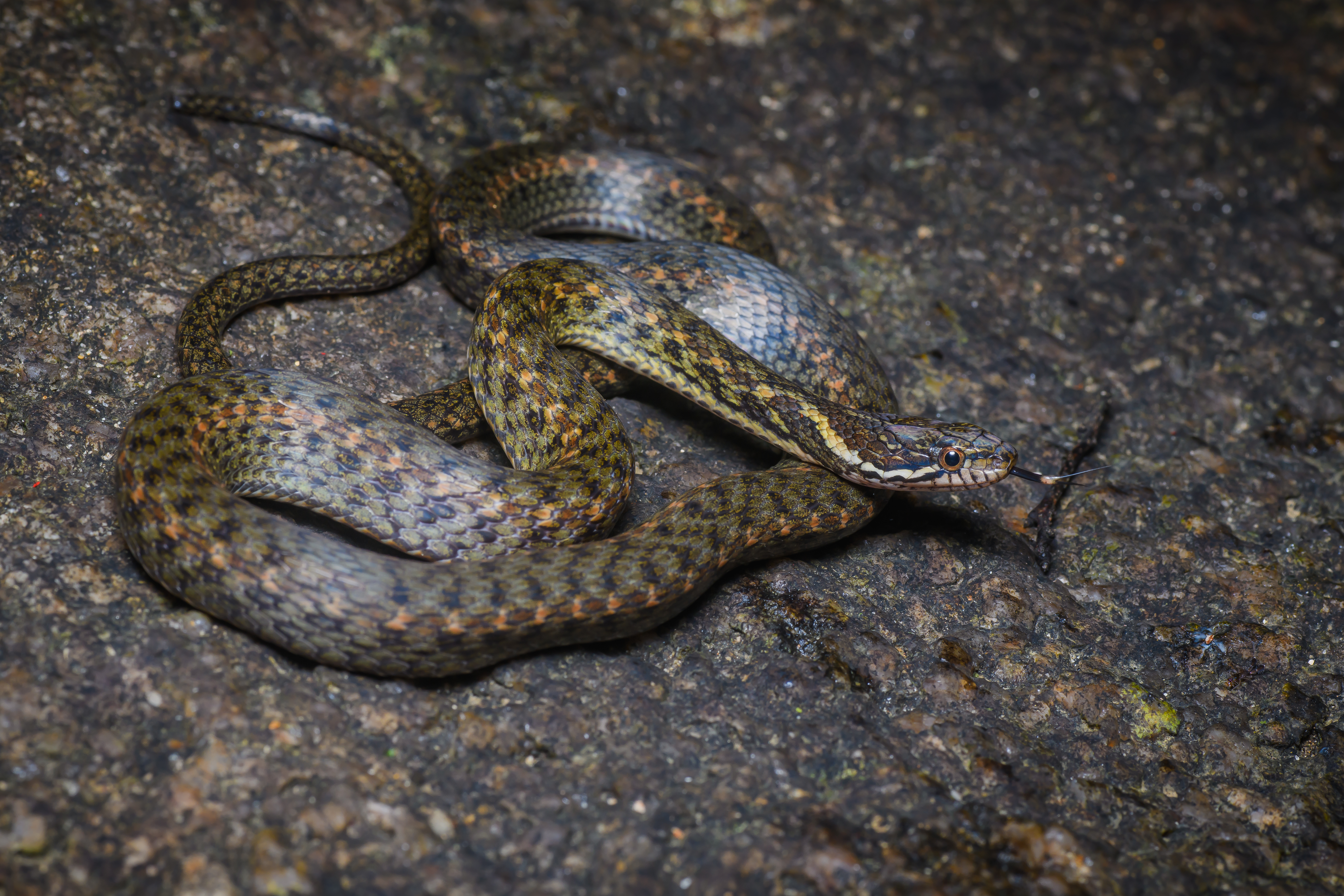

Conservation status
- Least Concern (IUCN 3.1)

Scientific classification
- Kingdom: Animalia
- Phylum: Chordata
- Class: Reptilia
- Order: Squamata
- Suborder: Serpentes
- Family: Colubridae
- Genus: Hebius
- Species: H. boulengeri

Binomial name
- Hebius boulengeri (Gressitt, 1937)

Synonyms
- Natrix boulengeri Gressitt, 1937; Amphiesma boulengeri — Malnate, 1960; Hebius boulengeri — Guo et al., 2014; Amphiesma boulengeri — Wallach et al., 2014

= Hebius boulengeri =

Species of snake

Hebius boulengeri is a species of snake in the family Colubridae. The species is native to East Asia and Southeast Asia. It is also known commonly as the Tai-yong keelback or Boulenger's keelback.

== Etymology ==
The specific name, boulengeri, is in honor of Belgian-British herpetologist George Albert Boulenger.

== Geographic range ==
H. boulengeri is found in Cambodia, China, and Vietnam.

== Habitat ==
The preferred natural habitats of H. boulengeri are forest and freshwater streams and wetlands. It is also found in rice paddies.

== Diet ==
H. boulengeri preys upon fishes and amphibians.

== Reproduction ==
H. boulengeri is oviparous.
