= Hebius terrakarenorum =

Scientific classification
- Kingdom: Animalia
- Phylum: Chordata
- Class: Reptilia
- Order: Squamata
- Suborder: Serpentes
- Family: Colubridae
- Genus: Hebius
- Species: H. terrakarenorum

Binomial name
- Hebius terrakarenorum Hauser, Smits, & David, 2022

Species of snake

Hebius terrakarenorum is a species of snake of the family Colubridae. The snake is found in Thailand.
