= Kuatun keelback =

Conservation status
- Least Concern (IUCN 3.1)

Scientific classification
- Kingdom: Animalia
- Phylum: Chordata
- Class: Reptilia
- Order: Squamata
- Suborder: Serpentes
- Family: Colubridae
- Genus: Hebius
- Species: H. craspedogaster

Binomial name
- Hebius craspedogaster (Boulenger, 1899)

Synonyms
- Tropidonotus craspedogaster; Natrix craspedogaster; Tropidonotus gastrotaenia; Amphiesma craspedogaster

Species of snake

The Kuatun keelback (Hebius craspedogaster) is a species of snake of the family Colubridae.

== Geographic range ==
The snake is found in China and Vietnam.
