= Hebius inas =

Conservation status
- Least Concern (IUCN 3.1)

Scientific classification
- Kingdom: Animalia
- Phylum: Chordata
- Class: Reptilia
- Order: Squamata
- Suborder: Serpentes
- Family: Colubridae
- Genus: Hebius
- Species: H. inas

Binomial name
- Hebius inas (Laidlaw, 1901)

Synonyms
- Tropidonotus inas Laidlaw, 1901; Natrix inas (Laidlaw, 1901); Amphiesma inas (Laidlaw, 1901)

Species of snake

Hebius inas, commonly known as the Malayan mountain keelback or Gunung Inas keelback, is a species of snake of the family Colubridae.

== Geographic range ==
The snake is found in Peninsular Malaysia, Sumatra (Indonesia), and Thailand.
