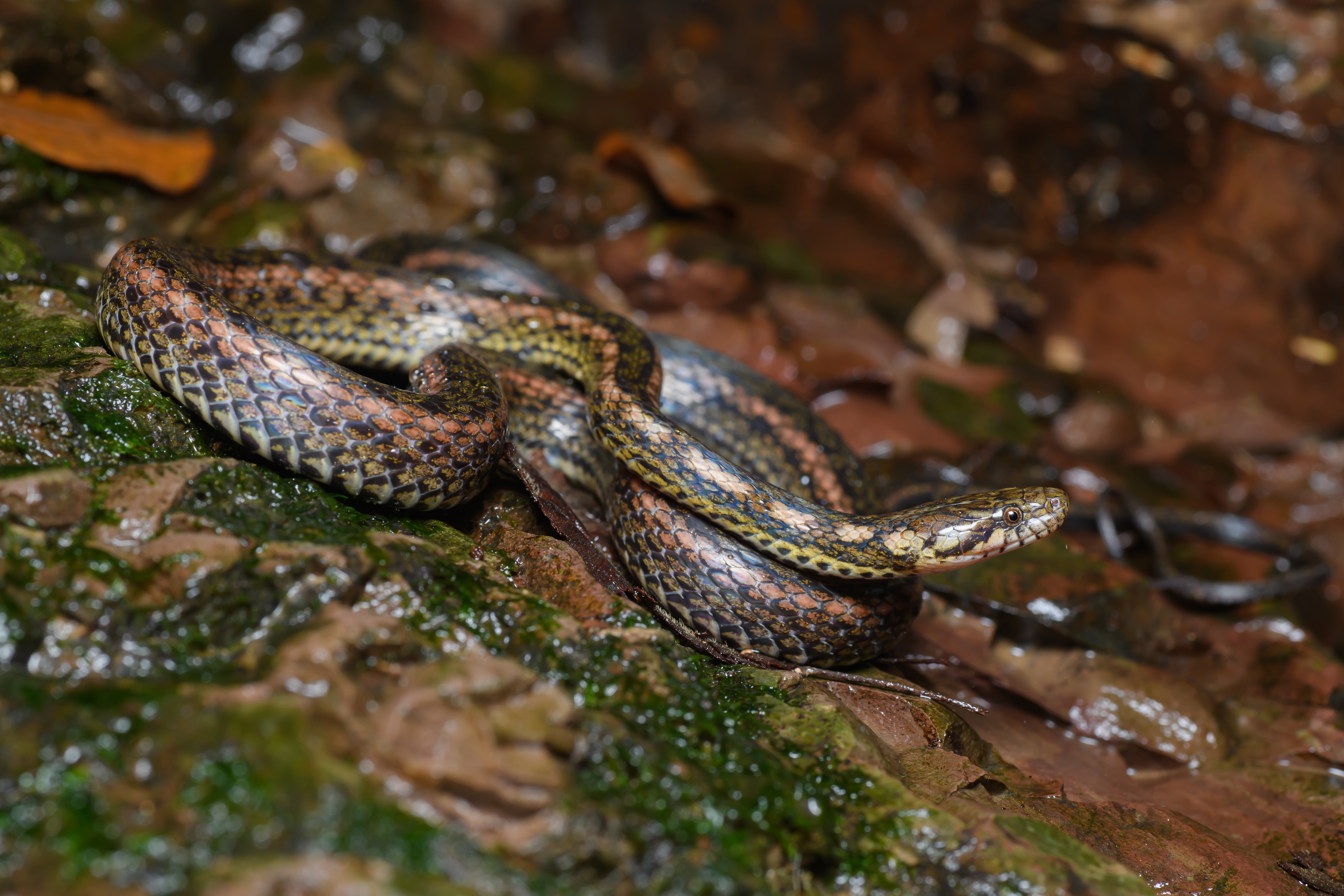

Conservation status
- Least Concern (IUCN 3.1)

Scientific classification
- Kingdom: Animalia
- Phylum: Chordata
- Class: Reptilia
- Order: Squamata
- Suborder: Serpentes
- Family: Colubridae
- Genus: Hebius
- Species: H. deschauenseei

Binomial name
- Hebius deschauenseei (Taylor, 1934)

Synonyms
- Natrix deschauenseei Taylor, 1934; Macropophis deschauenseei – Bourret, 1936; Amphiesma deschauenseei — Malnate, 1960; Hebius deschauenseei — Guo et al., 2014

= Hebius deschauenseei =

Species of snake

Hebius deschauenseei, commonly known as the northern keelback or Deschauensee's keelback, is a species of nonvenomous snake in the subfamily Natricinae of the family Colubridae. The species is endemic to Asia.

== Etymology ==
The specific name, deschauenseei, is in honor of American ornithologist Rodolphe Meyer de Schauensee, who collected the type specimen.

== Geographic range ==
H. deschauenseei is found in Thailand, Vietnam, and southern China (Yunnan and Guizhou).

Its type locality is in Chiang Mai province of Thailand.

== Habitat ==
The preferred natural habitat of H. deschauenseei is forest with streams, at altitudes from sea level to 300 m (980 ft).

== Reproduction ==
H. deschsuenseei is oviparous.
