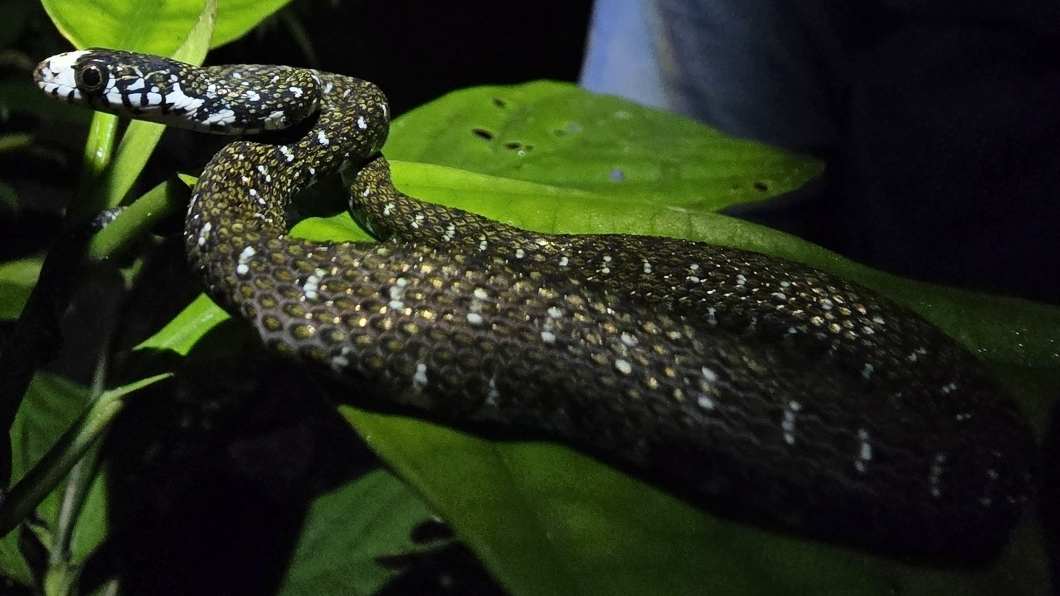
- Image of a Hebius flavifrons

Conservation status
- Least Concern (IUCN 3.1)

Scientific classification
- Kingdom: Animalia
- Phylum: Chordata
- Class: Reptilia
- Order: Squamata
- Suborder: Serpentes
- Family: Colubridae
- Genus: Hebius
- Species: H. flavifrons

Binomial name
- Hebius flavifrons (Boulenger, 1887)

Synonyms
- Tropidonotus flavifrons Boulenger, 1887; Natrix flavifrons – Dunn, 1923; Amphiesma flavifrons – Manthey & Grossmann, 1997

= Sabah keelback =

Species of snake

The Sabah keelback (Hebius flavifrons) is a nonvenomous colubrid endemic to Borneo.

== Description ==
Adults are about 54 cm (21 inches) in total length, of which about 18 cm (7 inches) is tail. Body slender; midbody scales 19, keeled; ventrals 149–157; subcaudals 92–101; dorsum olive-grey, with darker markings; a distinctive white to yellowish-cream spot on snout.

== Habitat and behavior ==
It is frequently encountered in rivers in the plains and midhills, seen swimming with its head held out of water.

== Diet ==
Its diet includes frog eggs, tadpoles and frogs.

== Reproduction ==
Nothing is known about its reproductive biology.

== Geographic range ==
It is endemic to Borneo. It has been found in Brunei, Sabah and Sarawak.
