= Rodolphe Meyer de Schauensee =

American ornithologist (1901–1984)

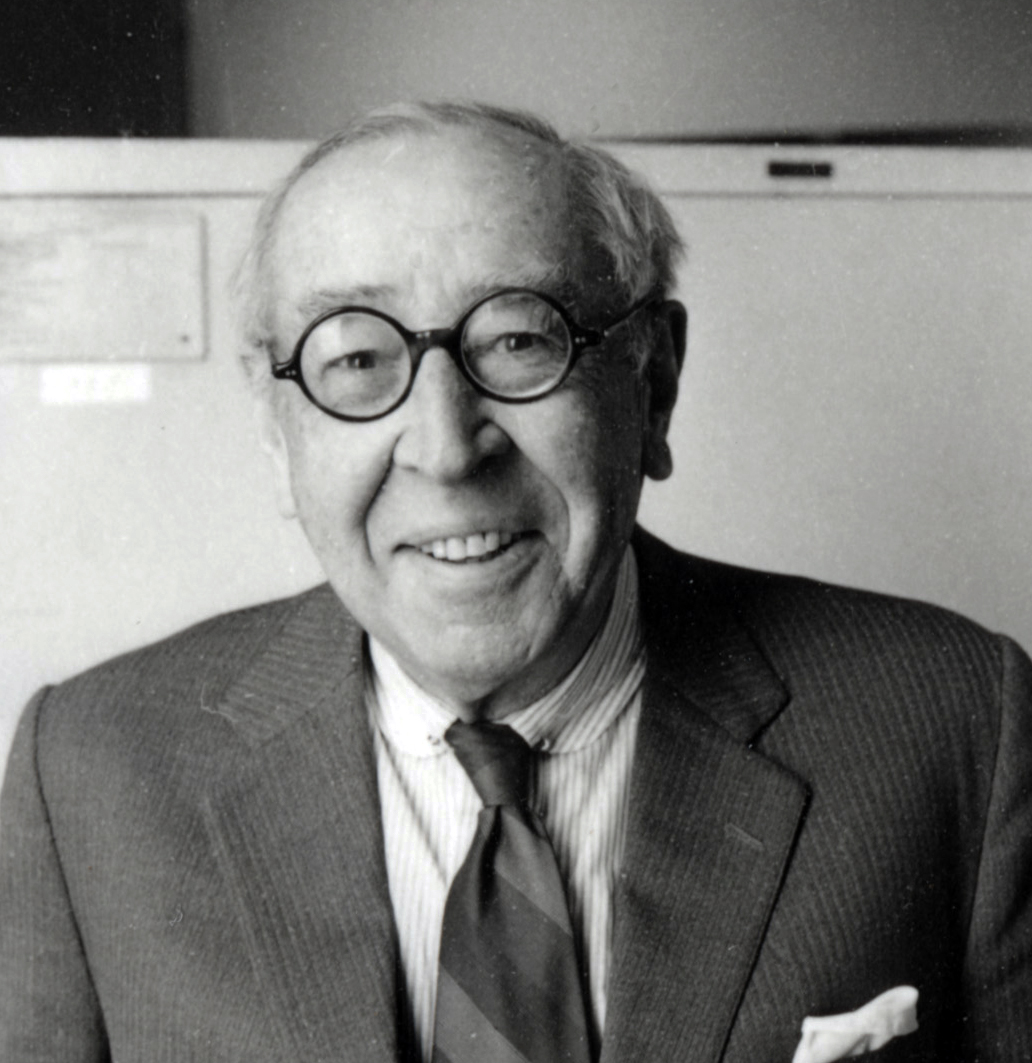
- Born: Rodolphe Meyer de Schauensee; January 4, 1901; Rome, Lazio, Kingdom of Italy
- Died: April 24, 1984 (aged 83); Philadelphia, Pennsylvania, U.S.
- Citizenship: American; Swiss
- Occupation: Ornithologist
- Spouse: Williamina Wemyss Wentz (m. 1936)
- Children: 2
- Scientific career
- Author abbrev. (zoology): Meyer de Schauensee

Rodolphe Meyer de Schauensee (/ˈmaɪ.ər də ˈʃaʊənzeɪ/; January 4, 1901 – April 24, 1984) was a Swiss-American ornithologist.

== Early life and education ==
Meyer de Schauensee was born January 4, 1901, in Rome, Italy, one of two sons, to Baron Frederick Meyer de Schauensee and his American-born wife Matilda (née Toland; died 1932). His father was from a well-established Swiss aristocratic family originally from Lucerne that owned Schauensee Castle. In 1913, the family moved to the United States. He attended the Hoosac School in Hoosick, New York. He moved to Wynnewood, Pennsylvania in the 1920s.

== Career ==
He was the curator of ornithology at the Academy of Natural Sciences in Philadelphia for nearly fifty years. He was particularly noted for his study of South American birds. He expanded the academy's collection of bird skins, taking part in collecting trips to Brazil, Thailand, Burma, southern Africa, the East Indies, and Guatemala. He wrote about the birds of South America, including the groundbreaking A Guide to the Birds of South America in 1970, and published a book on the birds of China just two weeks before his death.

De Schauensee is commemorated in the scientific names of two species of snakes, Eunectes deschauenseei and Hebius deschauenseei. He is also the namesake of the green-capped tanager (Stilpnia meyerdeschauenseei).

== Personal life ==
Meyer de Schauensee married Williamina Wemyss Wentz (1905–1989), a daughter of John Leisenring Wentz and Sarah Ward Brinton (later Audenried). Her paternal grandfather was John Shriver Wentz, a coal industrialist associated with the Wentz Coal and Iron Company as well as the Upper Lehigh Coal Company. Her maternal grandfather was Dr. John Hill Brinton, a surgeon. They had two daughters;

- Maude Meyer de Schauensee (born 1937), twin of Maxine
- Maxine Meyer de Schauensee (born 1937), twin of Maude, married to Howard H. Lewis, an attorney and philanthropist of Bryn Mawr. They had two sons; J. Rodolphe Lewis and Howard H. Lewis Jr.

Meyer de Schauensee died April 24, 1984, in Philadelphia, Pennsylvania aged 83.
