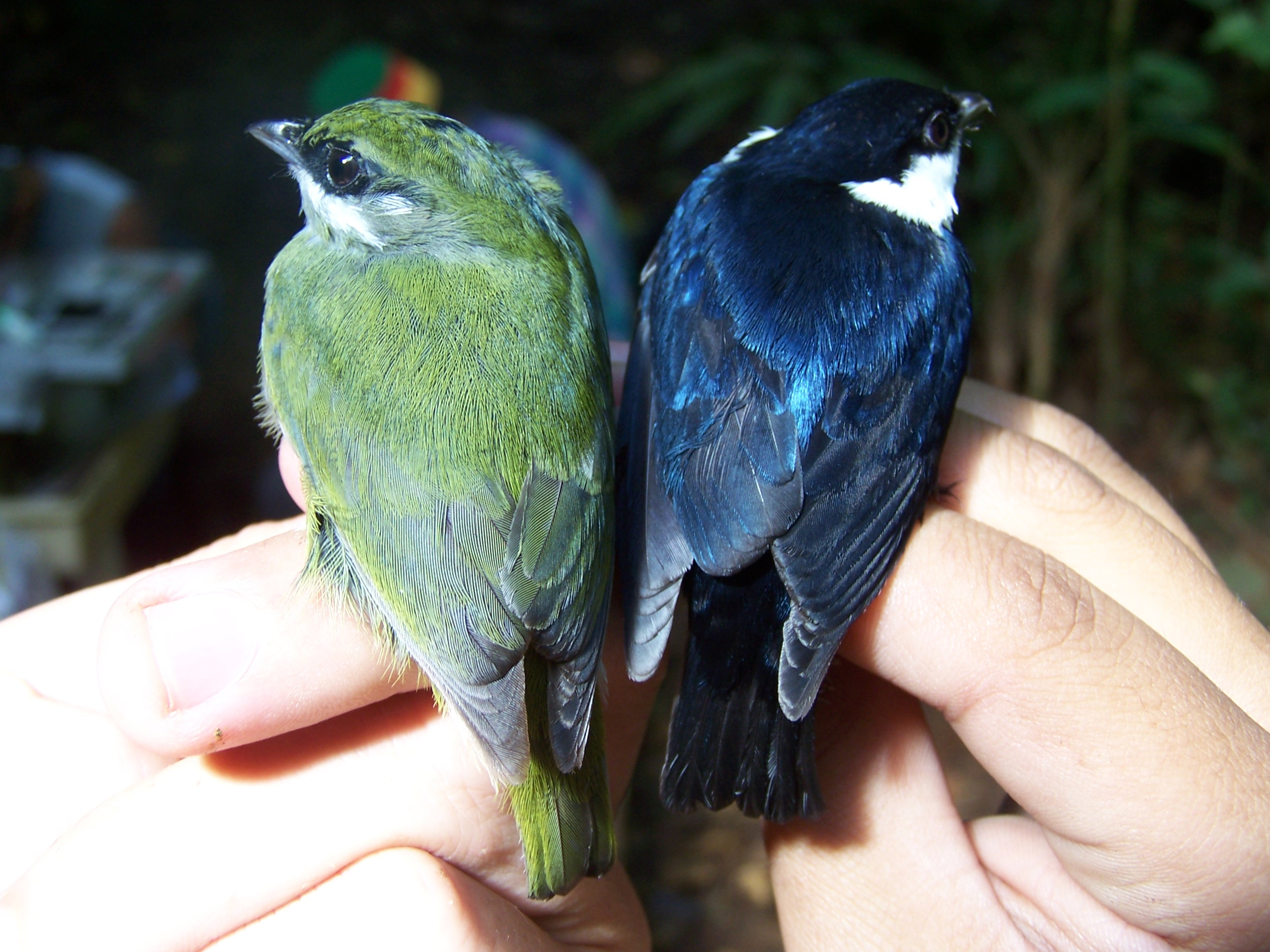

Conservation status
- Least Concern (IUCN 3.1)

Scientific classification
- Kingdom: Animalia
- Phylum: Chordata
- Class: Aves
- Order: Passeriformes
- Family: Pipridae
- Genus: Corapipo
- Species: C. altera

Binomial name
- Corapipo altera Hellmayr, 1906

= White-ruffed manakin =

Species of bird

The white-ruffed manakin (Corapipo altera) is a sub-oscine (Tyranni), passerine bird in the manakin family. It is a resident breeder in the tropical New World from eastern Honduras to northwestern Colombia. Its typical habitat is wet forest, adjacent clearings and tall secondary growth. It is a small, plump bird about 10 centimetres (4 in) long. Males have glossy blue-black plumage with a white erectile ruff on the throat and females are green. At breeding time, males are involved in lekking behaviour on the forest floor during which they puff out their neck feathers. This is a fairly common species with a wide range.

== Description ==
The white-ruffed manakin is, like its relatives, a compact short-tailed bird with a flat, wide bill, dark legs and striking male plumage. It is typically 10 cm long and weighs ~11 g (9–14 g; males are smaller than females).

The adult male is mostly glossy blue-black with a white erectile ruff on the throat and sides of the neck. His wings are modified, with a very short outer primary. Females and birds in their first year of life are olive-green with a greyish throat. In their second year, males molt into a mostly-green plumage but with a black mask and partial white ruff. Only following the breeding season in their third year do they acquire the adult plumage.

== Distribution and habitat ==
It is common in the foothills and middle elevations of Central America, breeding mainly between 400 and 600 m on the Caribbean slope and up to 1500 m on the Pacific slopes. Some populations are partial altitudinal migrants, meaning that some individuals migrate to lower elevations during the wet (non-breeding) season. This is a species of wet forest, mainly restricted to primary forest, but sometimes occupying adjacent clearings and tall secondary growth.

== Behaviour and ecology ==
=== Breeding ===
Like other manakins, this species has fascinating, breeding biology. Males display at leks. These consist of multiple fallen mossy logs on or near the forest floor within earshot of one another. Males can display alone or in coordinated displays with other males. Their displays consist of slow fluttering "butterfly" flights to and from their logs and between nearby perches, log landings and "throat flags" while crouched and flicking wings. The culmination of the display consists of a butterfly flight from the log circling up above the forest canopy, above-canopy flights accompanied by high, thin "seeuw-seeuw" calls, then a high speed dive to the log, followed by a jump and about-face. Males make three sounds during the dive and jump portion of the display, characterized as "flap-chee-wah". Females visit multiple logs and select a male with whom to mate. If she is interested, she will land on a males' log. Copulation always occurs on the log, and is preceded by the flap-chee-wah display with the male doing his final jump over the female and copulating immediately afterward. Young males often practice displays, sometimes in groups of 4–5, typically on logs that are not used by adults in that season. The degree to which males display together varies widely and is relatively constant within a season. Relative to other manakin species, male ownership of log, and log use from year to year are relatively dynamic with ~40% of them turning over between years at one site. The female lays two brown-speckled white eggs in a shallow cup nest 5–7 m high in a horizontal tree fork. Nest-building, incubation for 18–21 days, and care of the young are undertaken by the female alone, since manakins do not form stable pairs. In Central America, males display primarily from March through May and peak fledging appears to occur in June based on mist-net records. This corresponds to the driest months of the year.

=== Food and feeding ===
The white-ruffed manakin feeds low in the trees on fruit and some spiders and insects, both plucked from the foliage in flight. Males are highly frugivorous, with over 90% of their diet being fruit. Females increase the proportion of arthropods in their diet during the breeding season. A large proportion of their diet consists of small berries produced by plants in the Melastomataceae. Manakins forage alone or sometime forms loose groups in its breeding areas (particularly bands of young males), but is more solitary in the lowlands, although it may join tanagers and others in mixed-species feeding flocks.

Molt occurs on breeding grounds, initiated first in young males as early as July, followed by reproductive-aged (i.e. 4th year or older) males, and then females. At the population-level, it can be relatively protracted, lasting through to October. In altitudinal migrant populations, downhill movements occur during or immediately following heavy, multi-day rainstorms starting as early as July, and continuing through the latter half of the year. Once birds reach lower-elevation non-breeding areas, they remain there until uphill migration in February. Males are more likely to migrate than females.

== Status ==
One study in Costa Rica found that the white-ruffed manakin appears to have maintained substantial genetic connectivity despite habitat fragmentation. This suggests that manakins may have no trouble dispersing across non-forest habitat patches.

This bird has a very wide range, is fairly common and is presumed to have a large total population. The population trend is thought to be stable and the International Union for Conservation of Nature has rated the bird's conservation status as being of "least concern".
