= Hebius lacrima =

Conservation status
- Data Deficient (IUCN 3.1)

Scientific classification
- Kingdom: Animalia
- Phylum: Chordata
- Class: Reptilia
- Order: Squamata
- Suborder: Serpentes
- Family: Colubridae
- Genus: Hebius
- Species: H. lacrima

Binomial name
- Hebius lacrima Purkayastha & David, 2019

Species of snake

Hebius lacrima, the crying keelback, is a species of snake of the family Colubridae. The snake is endemic to Arunachal Pradesh, India.
