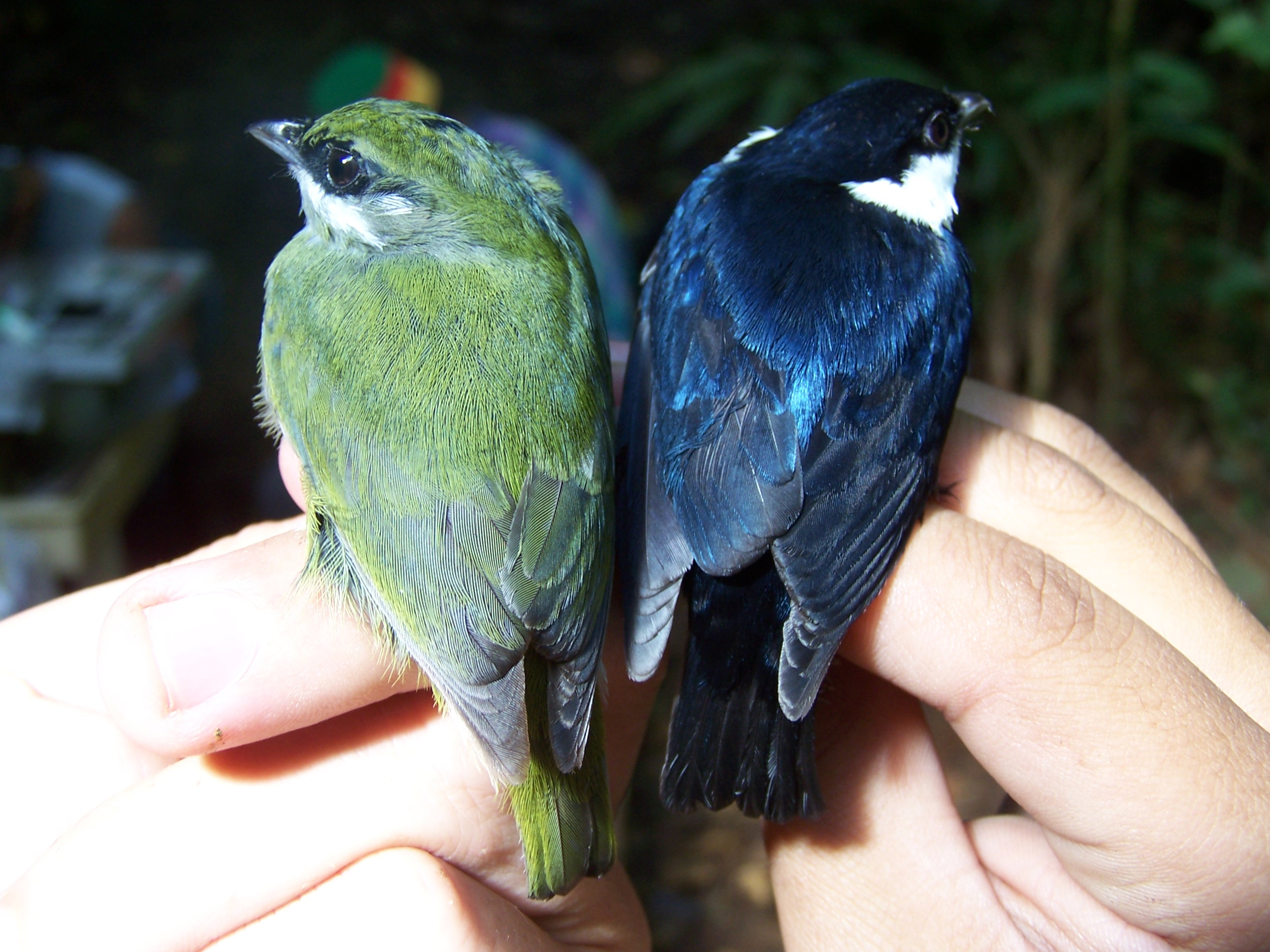
- White-ruffed manakin (Corapipo altera)

Scientific classification
- Domain: Eukaryota
- Kingdom: Animalia
- Phylum: Chordata
- Class: Aves
- Order: Passeriformes
- Family: Pipridae
- Genus: Corapipo; Bonaparte, 1854

Type species
- Pipra guttaralis Linnaeus, 1766

= Corapipo =

Genus of birds

Corapipo is a genus of birds in the manakin family Pipridae that are found in Central America and northern parts of South America.

== Taxonomy ==
The genus Corapipo was introduced by the French naturalist Charles Lucien Bonaparte in 1854 with the white-throated manakin as the type species.

The genus contains three species:

- White-throated manakin (Corapipo gutturalis)
- White-ruffed manakin (Corapipo altera) Sometimes treated as a subspecies of C. leucorrhoa.
- White-bibbed manakin (Corapipo leucorrhoa)
