= Hebius venningi =

Conservation status
- Least Concern (IUCN 3.1)

Scientific classification
- Kingdom: Animalia
- Phylum: Chordata
- Class: Reptilia
- Order: Squamata
- Suborder: Serpentes
- Family: Colubridae
- Genus: Hebius
- Species: H. venningi

Binomial name
- Hebius venningi (Wall, 1910)

Synonyms
- Tropidonotus venningi Wall, 1910; Natrix venningi — M.A. Smith, 1943; Amphiesma venningi — Malnate, 1960; Paranatrix venningi — Mahendra, 1984; Hebius venningi — Guo et al., 2014

Species of snake

Hebius venningi, commonly known as the Chin Hills keelback or Venning's keelback, is a species of snake in the family Colubridae. The species is endemic to Asia.

== Etymology ==
The specific name, venningi, is in honor of British ornithologist Francis Esmond Wingate Venning (1882–1970).

== Geographic range ==
H. venningi is found in southwestern China (Yunnan and Guangxi), northeastern India (Meghalaya, Mizoram, and Arunachal Pradesh), and northern Myanmar. It is also reported from Bangladesh.

== Habitat ==
The preferred natural habitats of H. venningi are forest and freshwater wetlands, at altitudes of 900–1,786 m (2,953–5,860 ft)

== Description ==
H. venningi is grayish brown dorsally, and yellowish or pinkish ventrally. It may attain a total length (including tail) of 68 cm (27 in).

== Diet ==
H. venningi preys upon tadpoles.

== Reproduction ==
H. venningi is oviparous.
