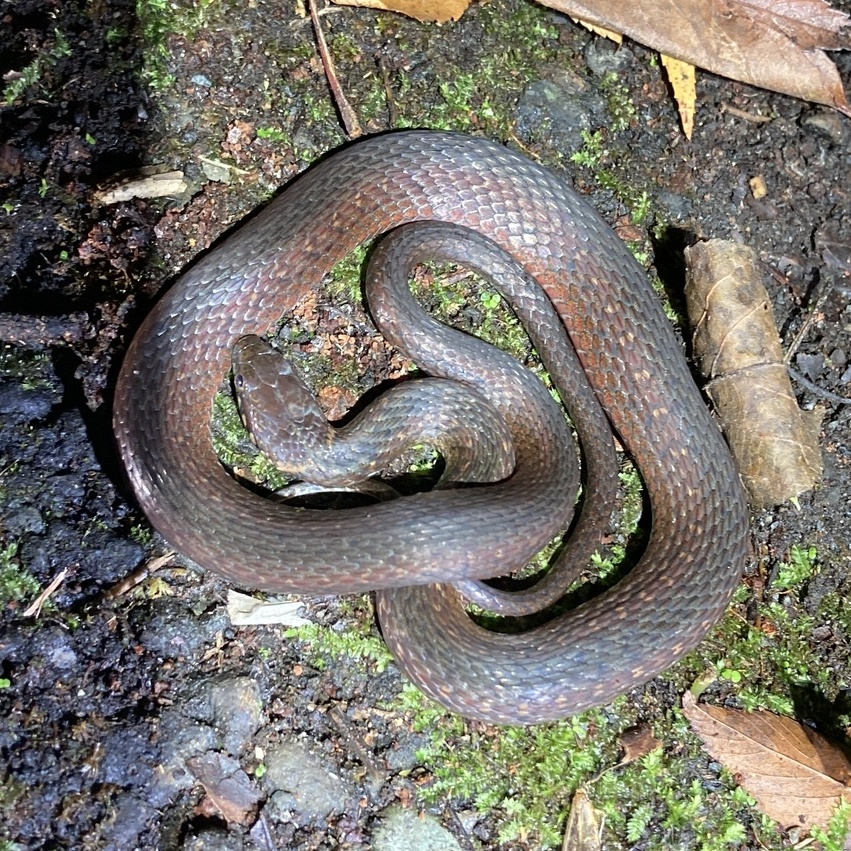

Conservation status
- Least Concern (IUCN 3.1)

Scientific classification
- Kingdom: Animalia
- Phylum: Chordata
- Class: Reptilia
- Order: Squamata
- Suborder: Serpentes
- Family: Colubridae
- Genus: Hebius
- Species: H. sauteri

Binomial name
- Hebius sauteri (Boulenger, 1909)

Synonyms
- Tropidonotus sauteri Boulenger, 1909; Natrix copei Van Denburgh, 1909; Natrix sauteri — Mell, 1931; Amphiesma sauteri — Malnate, 1960; Hebius sauteri — Guo et al., 2014

= Hebius sauteri =

Species of snake

Hebius sauteri, commonly known as Sauter's keelback or the Kosempo keelback, is a species of snake in the family Colubridae. The species is endemic to Asia.

== Etymology ==
The specific name, sauteri, is in honor of German entomologist Hans Sauter.

== Distribution and habitat ==
H. sauteri is found in southern China, Taiwan, and northern Vietnam.

The preferred natural habitats of H. sauteri are freshwater wetlands, grassland, shrubland, and forest, at altitudes of 580–1,450 m (1,900–4,760 ft).

== Reproduction ==
H. sauteri is oviparous.
