= Hebius parallelus =

Conservation status
- Data Deficient (IUCN 3.1)

Scientific classification
- Kingdom: Animalia
- Phylum: Chordata
- Class: Reptilia
- Order: Squamata
- Suborder: Serpentes
- Family: Colubridae
- Genus: Hebius
- Species: H. parallelus

Binomial name
- Hebius parallelus (Boulenger, 1890)

Synonyms
- Tropidonotus parallelus Boulenger, 1890; Natrix parallela – Mell, 1931; Amphiesma parallela – Malnate, 1960; Paranatrix parallela – Mahendra, 1984; Amphiesma parallelum – David et al., 1998

Species of snake

The Yunnan keelback (Hebius parallelus) is a species of natricine snake which is endemic to Asia.

== Geographic range ==
It is found in Bhutan, China (Tibet and Yunnan), Northeast India (Arunachal Pradesh, Assam, Sikkim, Nagaland) and Myanmar.

== Description ==
Dorsally, it is brown with two parallel yellowish, black-edged stripes on the body and tail. The ventrals and subcaudals are uniform yellow, or with a black dot on each side. There is a black streak from the eye to the corner of the mouth, and the labials are yellow.

It may have one, two, or three preocular scales, and has three postoculars. There are seven or eight upper labials (usually eight), with the third, fourth, and fifth entering the eye. The temporals may be 1 + 1, 1 + 2, or 2 + 2.

Strongly keeled dorsal scales arranged in 19 rows at midbody. Ventrals 163–175; anal plate divided; subcaudals 73–95, also divided.

Adults may attain 56 cm (22 inches) in total length with a tail of 14 cm (5½ inches).
