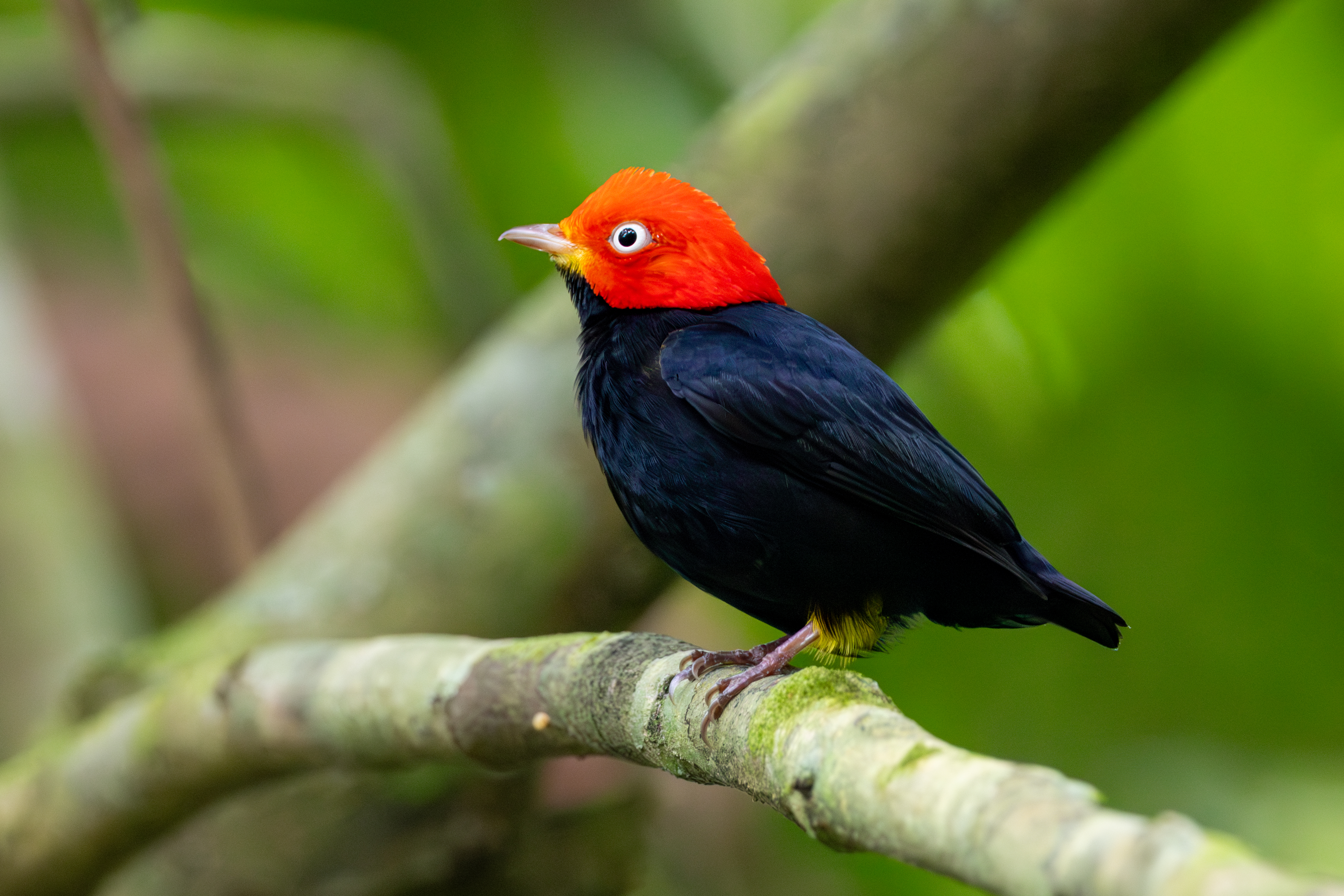
- Male

Conservation status
- Least Concern (IUCN 3.1)

Scientific classification
- Kingdom: Animalia
- Phylum: Chordata
- Class: Aves
- Order: Passeriformes
- Family: Pipridae
- Genus: Ceratopipra
- Species: C. mentalis

Binomial name
- Ceratopipra mentalis (Sclater, PL, 1857)

Synonyms
- Pipra mentalis (protonym); Dixiphia mentalis

Audio

= Red-capped manakin =

Species of bird

The red-capped manakin (Ceratopipra mentalis) is a species of bird in the family Pipridae. It is found in Belize, Colombia, Costa Rica, Ecuador, Guatemala, Honduras, Mexico, Nicaragua, Peru and Panama. Its natural habitat is subtropical or tropical moist lowland forest.

== Taxonomy ==
The red-capped manakin was formally described and illustrated in 1857 by the English zoologist Philip Sclater based on specimen collected by Auguste Sallé in Córdoba, Veracruz, southern Mexico. Sclater placed the species in the genus Pipra and coined the binomial name Pipra mentalis. The specific epithet mentalis is Latin meaning "pertaining to the chin".

The red-capped manakin was moved to the genus Ceratopipra when molecular phylogenetic studies found that Pipra was non-monophyletic. It is closely related to, and in eastern Panama sometimes hybridizes with, the golden-headed manakin.

Three subspecies are recognized subspecies:

- Ceratopipra mentalis mentalis (Sclater, PL, 1857) – southeast Mexico to east Costa Rica
- Ceratopipra mentalis ignifera (Bangs, 1901) – west Costa Rica and west Panama
- Ceratopipra mentalis minor (Hartert, 1898) – east Panama, west Colombia and northwest Ecuador

== Description ==
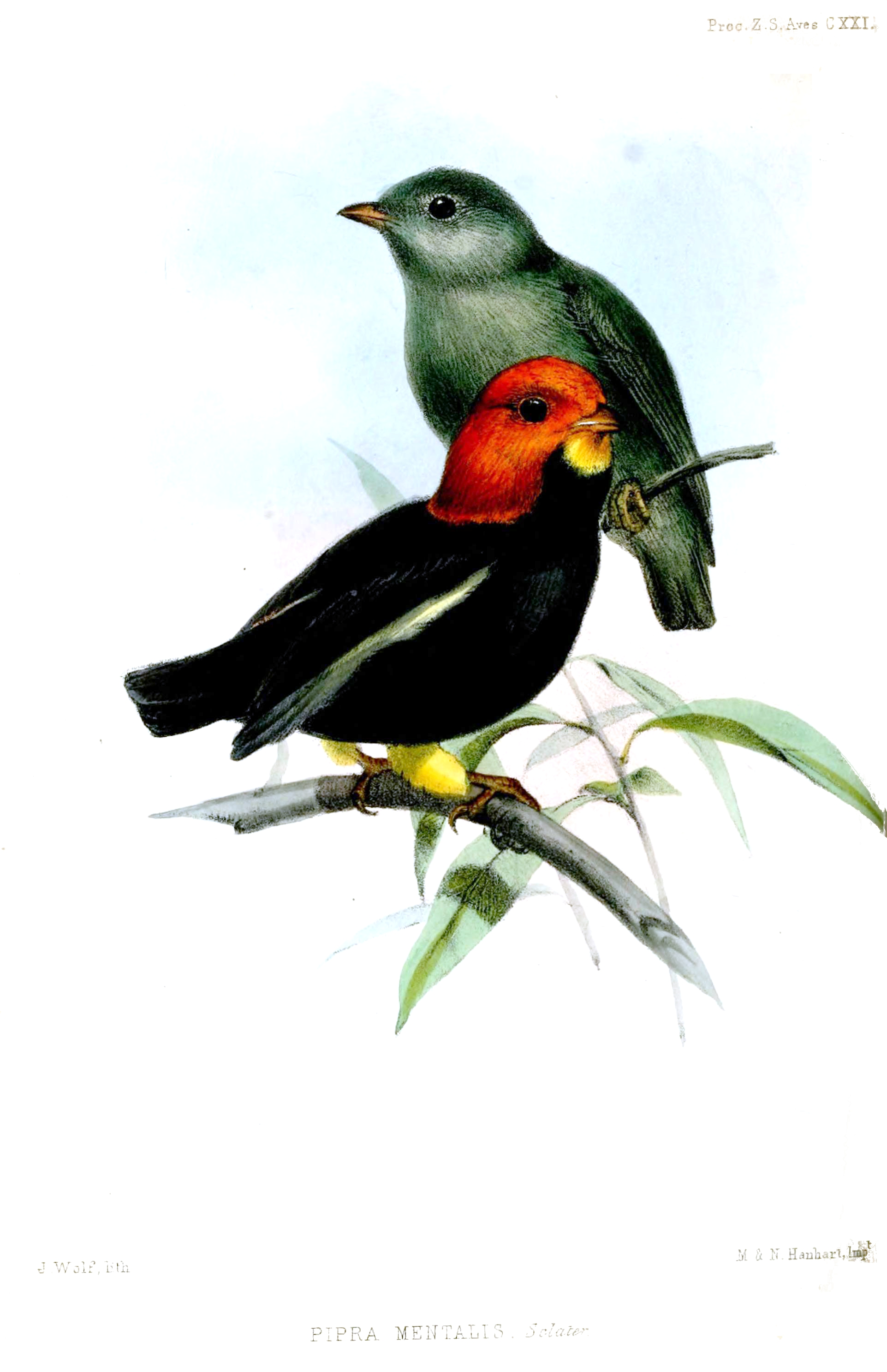

The red-capped manakin is a small passerine, measuring 4 in (10 cm) in length (Note: By convention, length is measured from the tip of the bill to the tip of the tail on a dead bird (or skin) laid on its back.) and weighing 16 g (0.56 oz). The male is velvety black apart from a bright red head and nape, bright yellow thighs, and a pale yellow chin and wing linings. The female is olive green above, with paler, more yellow-green underparts. Both sexes have dull brown legs. The male's irides are white, while those of the female and young are brown.

While the adult male is distinctive, the female and youngsters can be confused with several similar species. The male golden-collared manakin is larger, and has orange (rather than brown) legs, while the female velvety manakin is a brighter green (rather than olive).

== Habitat and range ==
Found primarily in humid forest and second growth woodland, the red-capped manakin typically occurs below 400–500 m (1,300–1,600 ft) above sea level, though it sometimes ranges as high as 900 m (3,000 ft). Most are resident, but some individuals are known to migrate to take advantage of changing food resources: the number of red-capped manakins caught in mist nets at La Selva Biological Reserve, in eastern Costa Rica, tripled in January and February, when a favored fruit ripened, for example, while the number caught at a nearby higher elevation site (where the fruits were not found) dropped to zero.

== Behavior ==
=== Food and feeding ===
The red-capped manakin is a frugivore, feeding almost exclusively on fruits. These pass very quickly through the bird's digestive system, typically taking less than 18 minutes to process. The manakins ability to process large quantities of fruit have evolved to be fast due to experiencing certain seasons where there is not an abundant amount of fruits. Therefore, they had to consume large volumes of food to get the nutrients they need. Seeds from a variety of plants are consumed; one study in Costa Rica found evidence of 70 species, including those from the genera Clidemia, Hampea, Henriettea, Leandra, Miconia, Ossaea, Pinzona and Psychotria, in the fecal droppings of red-capped manakins.
