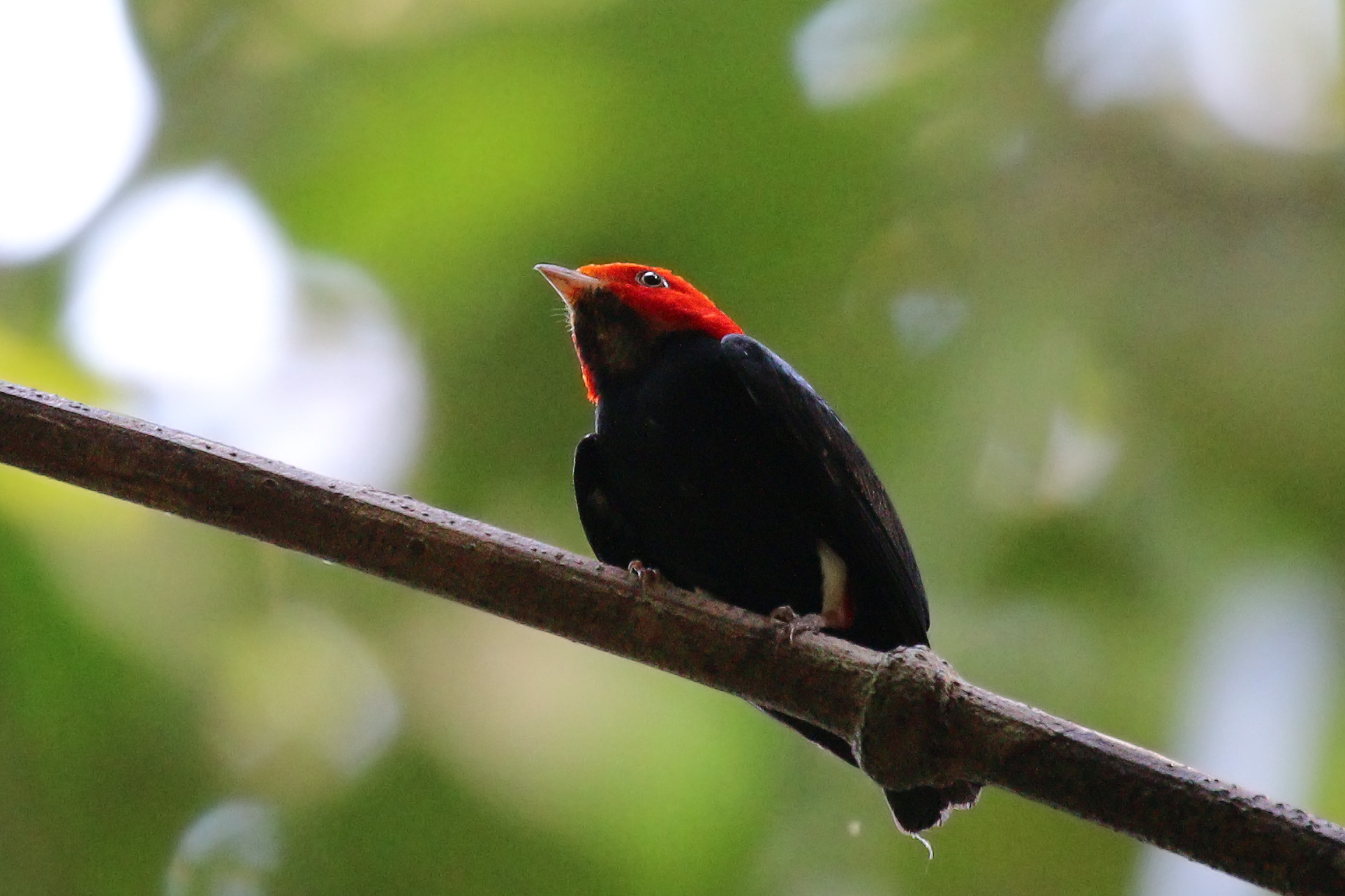
- Cristalino River; Southern Amazon, Brazil

Conservation status
- Least Concern (IUCN 3.1)

Scientific classification
- Kingdom: Animalia
- Phylum: Chordata
- Class: Aves
- Order: Passeriformes
- Family: Pipridae
- Genus: Ceratopipra
- Species: C. rubrocapilla

Binomial name
- Ceratopipra rubrocapilla (Temminck, 1821)

= Red-headed manakin =

Species of bird

The red-headed manakin (Ceratopipra rubrocapilla) is a species of bird in the family Pipridae. It is found in Bolivia, Brazil, and Peru.

== Taxonomy and systematics ==
The red-headed manakin was originally described as Pipra rubro-capilla. Though its present genus Ceratopipra had been erected in 1854, the red-headed manakin was not transferred to it until the early 2000s.

The red-headed manakin is monotypic. It, the red-capped manakin (C. mentalis), and the golden-headed manakin (C. erythrocephala) form a superspecies.

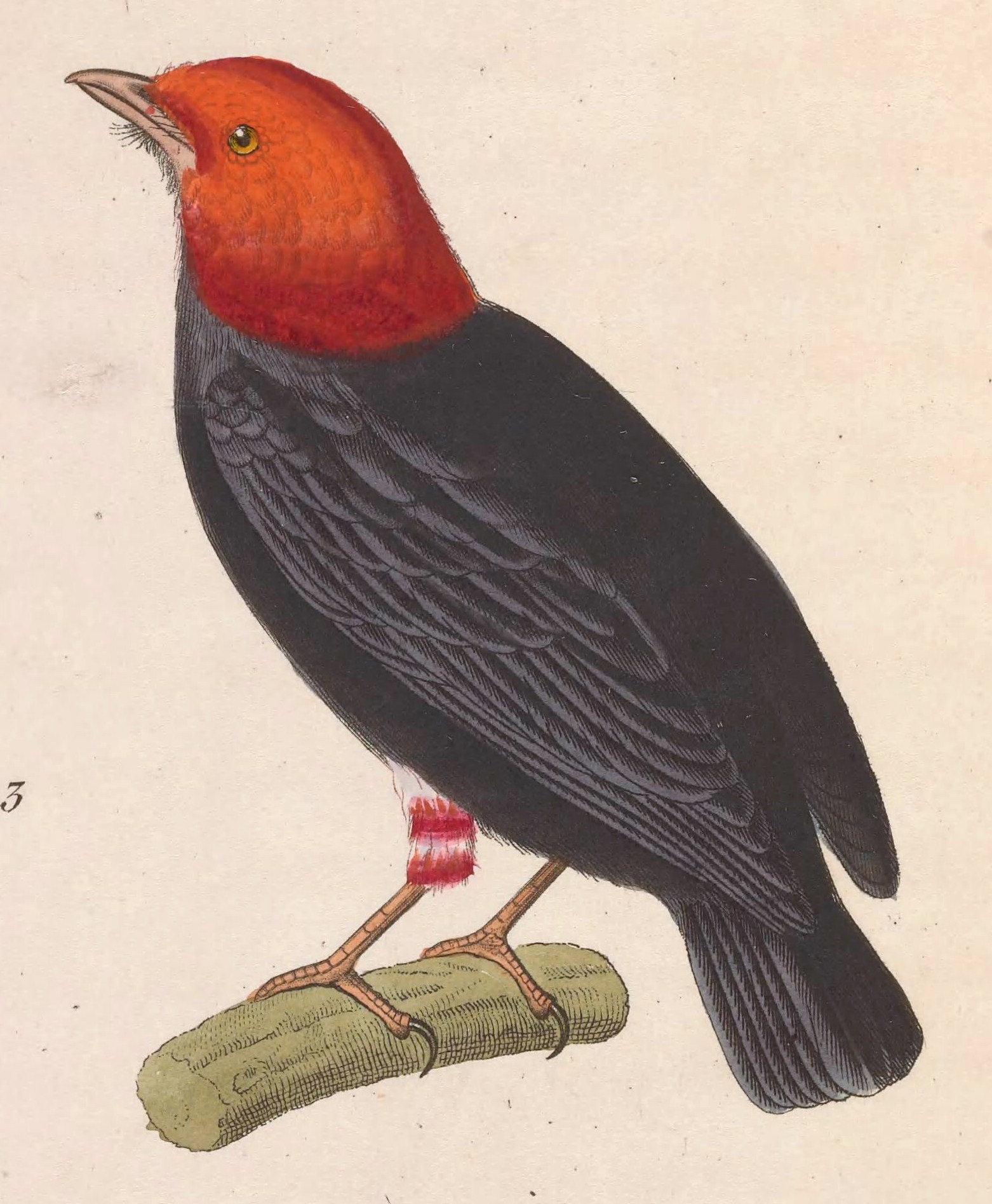
Illustration from the original description

== Description ==
The red-headed manakin is 10 to 10.5 cm (3.9 to 4.1 in) long and weighs about 11 to 17 g (0.39 to 0.60 oz). The species is sexually dimorphic and females are heavier than males. Adult males have an almost entirely red head and neck. Their thighs are also red. Their throat and the rest of their plumage are black. Adult females are mostly dull olive-green; their underparts are lighter than their back, especially on the belly. Both sexes have dull pinkish legs and feet. Males have a hazel-brown iris and a pale brownish bill; the female's iris and bill are darker.

== Distribution and habitat ==
The red-headed manakin has a disjunct distribution with two ranges. The much larger one includes eastern Loreto and eastern Madre de Dios departments of Peru. From there it extends east across northern Bolivia and the Amazon Basin of Brazil south of the Amazon River. It reaches the Atlantic in Maranhão and its southernmost edge in south-central Mato Grosso. A much smaller range extends along the eastern Brazilian coast from Pernambuco south to Rio de Janeiro state. The species inhabits humid forest and secondary woodland at elevations up to 500 m (1,600 ft).

== Behavior ==
=== Movement ===
The red-headed manakin is believed to be a year-round resident.

=== Feeding ===
The red-headed manakin feeds on small fruits and also insects. It plucks them while perched and with short flights from a perch.

=== Breeding ===
The red-headed manakin's breeding season has not been defined but includes September to April in the northern part of its larger Brazilian range. Males make a complex courtship display to females in a lek. Its elements include rapid flights and, upon landing, turning around and prominently displaying their red thighs. The few known nests were between about 2 and 5 m (7 and 16 ft) above the ground but not otherwise described. The clutch is two eggs. Fledging occurs 13 to 14 days after hatch. The incubation period and details of parental care are not known.

=== Vocalization ===
The male red-headed manakin's principal call is a somewhat variable "drree-dit, dree-dee-dew". It also makes a "sharp zit, zit" call and during the display flight "a series of kew notes".

== Status ==
The IUCN has assessed the red-headed manakin as being of Least Concern. It has a very large range; its population size is not known and is believed to be decreasing. No immediate threats have been identified. It is considered "locally fairly common" in Peru and common in Brazil. It occurs in at least two protected areas in Brazil but the coastal population is "much reduced by extensive destruction of lowland forest".
