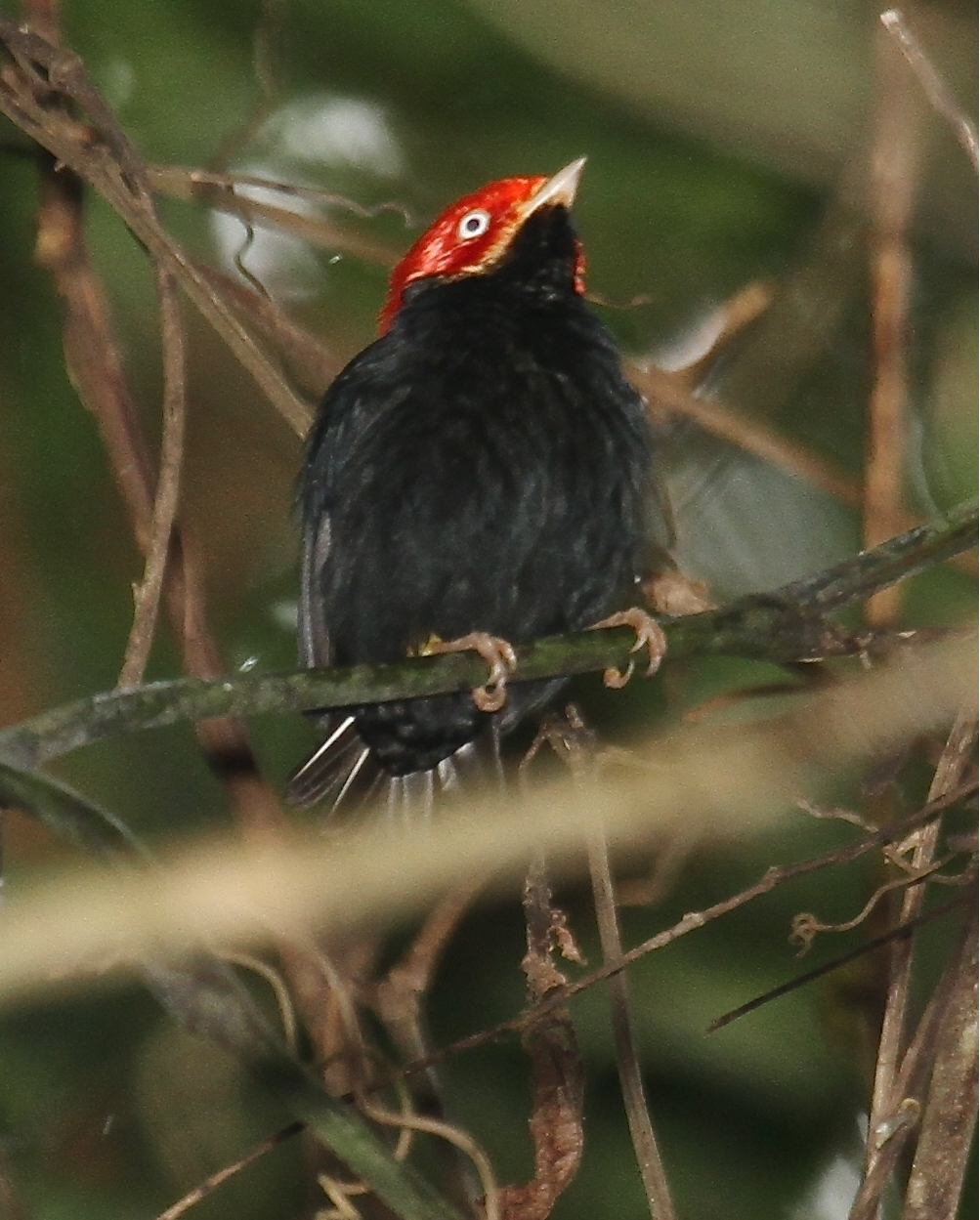

Conservation status
- Least Concern (IUCN 3.1)

Scientific classification
- Kingdom: Animalia
- Phylum: Chordata
- Class: Aves
- Order: Passeriformes
- Family: Pipridae
- Genus: Ceratopipra
- Species: C. chloromeros

Binomial name
- Ceratopipra chloromeros (Tschudi, 1844)

= Round-tailed manakin =

Species of bird

The round-tailed manakin (Ceratopipra chloromeros) is a species of bird in the family Pipridae. It is found in Bolivia, Brazil, and Peru.

== Taxonomy and systematics ==
The red-headed manakin was originally described as Pipra chloromeros. Though its present genus Ceratopipra had been erected in 1854, the round-tailed manakin was not transferred to it until the early 2000s.

The round-tailed manakin is monotypic.

== Description ==
The round-tailed manakin is 10.5 to 11 cm (4.1 to 4.3 in) long and weighs about 16.5 g (0.58 oz). The species is sexually dimorphic. Its tail has a rounder end than those of other Ceratopipra manakins. Adult males have an almost entirely red head and neck. Their thighs are creamy yellow. Their throat and the rest of their plumage are black. Adult females are mostly dull olive-green; their underparts are lighter than their back, especially on the belly. Both sexes have a blackish bill and smoky pinkish legs and feet. Males have a white iris and females a grayish one. Immature birds of both sexes resemble adult females but with a darker gray iris.

== Distribution and habitat ==
The round-tailed manakin is found from southern Amazonas Department in eastern Peru south through extreme western Acre in Brazil and into northern Bolivia as far as western Santa Cruz Department. It inhabits humid forest, of both terra firme and seasonally flooded types, in the lowlands and Andean foothills. In elevation it reaches 1,500 m (4,900 ft).

== Behavior ==
=== Movement ===
The round-tailed manakin is a year-round resident.

=== Feeding ===
The round-tailed manakin's diet and feeding behavior are not known. They are assumed to be similar to those of other Ceratopipra manakins, for one of which see here.

=== Breeding ===
The round-tailed manakin's breeding season spans at least August to November in southeastern Peru. Males display to females in a large lek. Display elements include flights back and forth between perches, swooping flights, and, upon landing, turning around and prominently displaying their yellow thighs. Nothing else is known about the species' breeding biology.

=== Vocalization ===
The round-tailed manakin sings "variable high metallic sounds, mellow whistles, squeaky chatters, and buzzes". Two vocalizations are "a buzzy tsuk'ZRRRT" and a "high rising-falling laugh".

== Status ==
The IUCN has assessed the round-tailed manakin as being of Least Concern. It has a large range; its population size is not known and is believed to be decreasing. No immediate threats have been identified. It is considered "locally fairly common" in Peru and rare in Brazil. It occurs in at least two protected areas in Peru.
