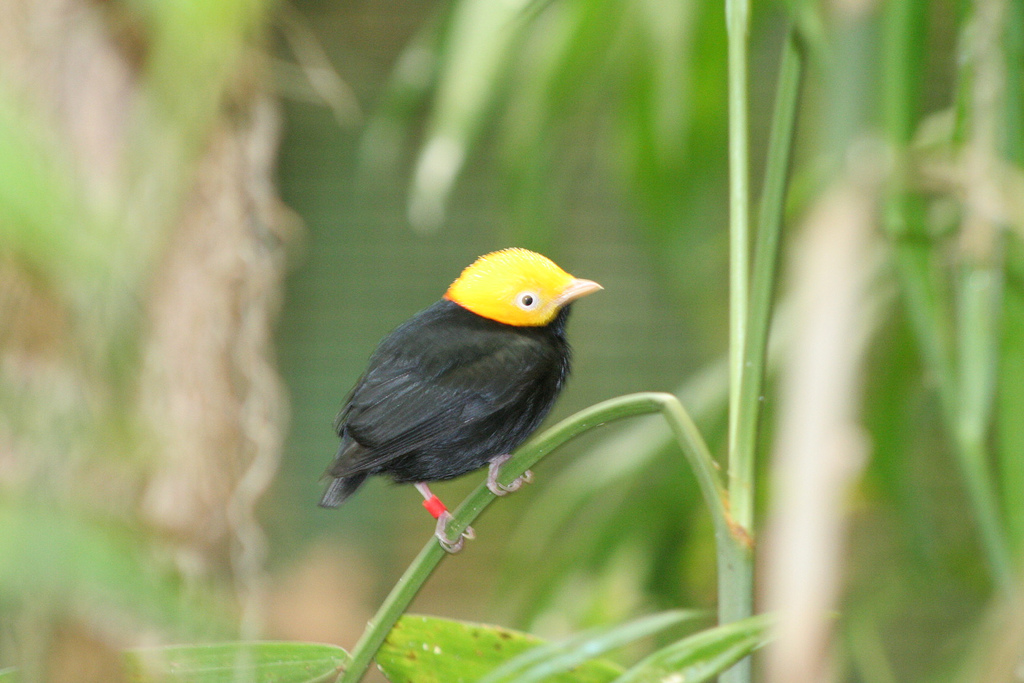
- Golden-headed manakin (male) (Ceratopipra erythrocephala)

Scientific classification
- Kingdom: Animalia
- Phylum: Chordata
- Class: Aves
- Order: Passeriformes
- Family: Pipridae
- Genus: Ceratopipra; Bonaparte, 1854

Type species
- Pipra cornuta von Spix, 1825

Species
- 5; see text

= Ceratopipra =

Genus of birds

Ceratopipra is a genus of passerine birds in the family Pipridae.

== Taxonomy ==
The genus Ceratopipra was introduced by the French naturalist Charles Lucien Bonaparte in 1854 with the scarlet-horned manakin as the type species. The name Ceratopipra combines the Ancient Greek κερας keras, κερατος keratos "horn" with the genus Pipra introduced by Carl Linnaeus in 1764.

== Species ==
The genus contains the five species:

Image	Scientific name	Common name	Distribution
	Ceratopipra cornuta	Scarlet-horned manakin	Venezuela and adjacent Guyana and northern Brazil
	Ceratopipra mentalis	Red-capped manakin	Belize, Colombia, Costa Rica, Ecuador, Guatemala, Honduras, Mexico, Nicaragua, Peru and Panama.
	Ceratopipra erythrocephala	Golden-headed manakin	from Panama, Colombia and Trinidad south and east to the Guianas and Brazil and northern Peru
	Ceratopipra rubrocapilla	Red-headed manakin	Bolivia, Brazil, and Peru.
	Ceratopipra chloromeros	Round-tailed manakin	Bolivia, Brazil, and Peru.

These species were previously included in the genus Pipra, but molecular phylogenetic studies have shown that this placement renders Pipra non-monophyletic.
