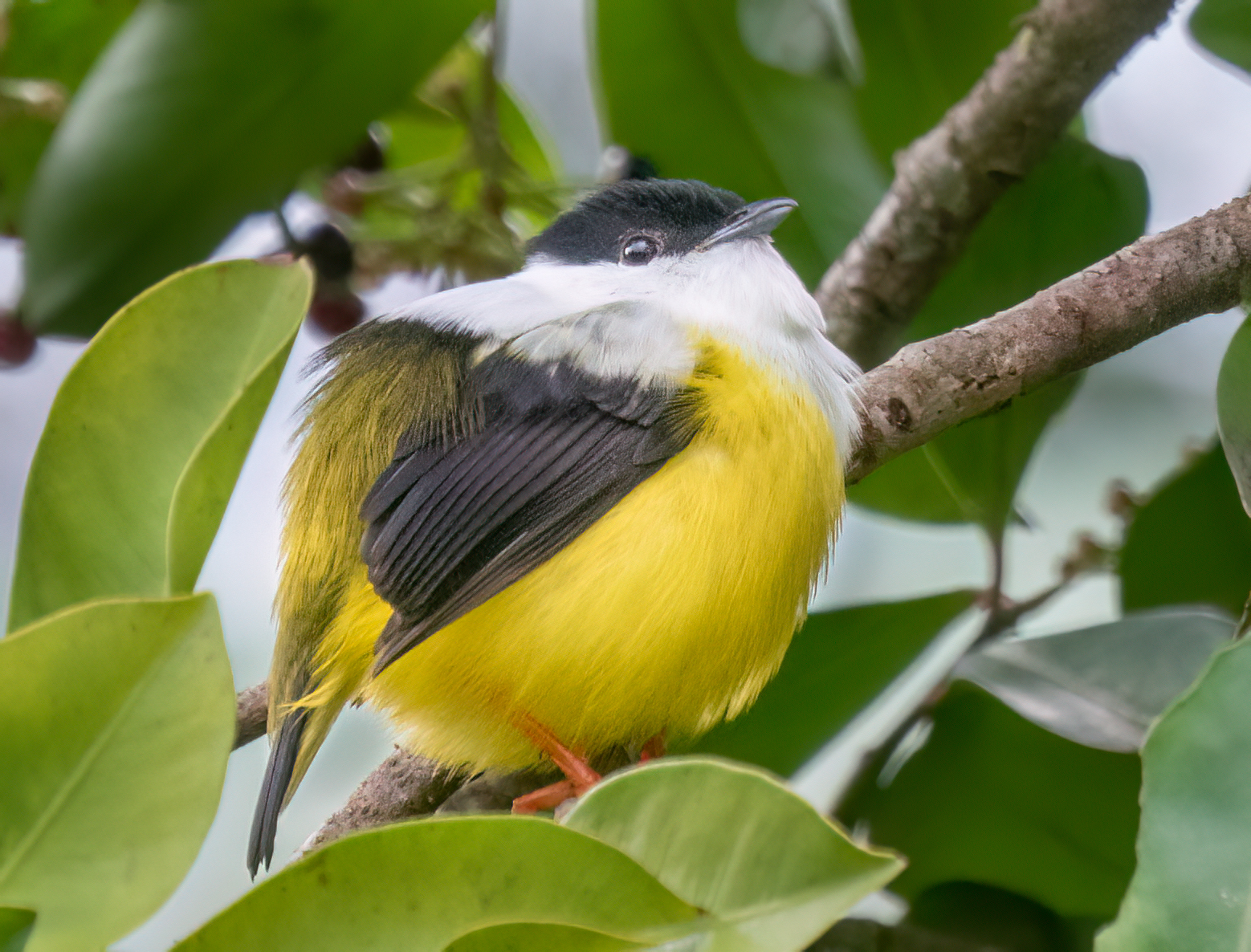
- Male in Costa Rica
- Wing sounds and calls recorded in Costa Rica

Conservation status
- Least Concern (IUCN 3.1)

Scientific classification
- Kingdom: Animalia
- Phylum: Chordata
- Class: Aves
- Order: Passeriformes
- Family: Pipridae
- Genus: Manacus
- Species: M. candei

Binomial name
- Manacus candei (Parzudaki, 1841)

= White-collared manakin =

Species of bird

The white-collared manakin (Manacus candei) is a passerine bird in the manakin family. It is a resident breeder in the tropical New World from southeastern Mexico to Costa Rica and the extreme west of Panama. It typically inhabits thickets at the edges of moist forest, tall secondary growth and old cacao plantations. It is a small, plump bird about 11 centimetres (4.3 in) long. Males have a black crown, mid-back band, wings and tail, an olive-green rump and yellow belly. Females and juveniles are olive-green with yellow bellies and resemble female orange-collared manakins. At breeding time, males are involved in lekking behaviour on the forest floor during which they puff out their neck feathers. This is a fairly common species with a wide range, and the International Union for Conservation of Nature has rated its conservation status as being of "least concern".

== Distribution and habitat ==
The bird is named after Admiral Antoine Marie Ferdinand de Maussion de Candé, an explorer of South America. It occurs in the lowlands and foothills of the Caribbean slope up to 700 m, being replaced on the Pacific slopes of Costa Rica and Panama by the closely related orange-collared (M. aurantiacus) and golden-collared (M. vitellinus) manakins.

It hybridizes extensively with the golden-collared manakin in a limited area in Bocas del Toro Province, Panama. The hybrids, which show a lemon yellow collar in males, were at one time considered a distinct species, the almirante manakin (Manacus×cerritus) (Brumfield et al., 2001; McDonald et al., 2001).

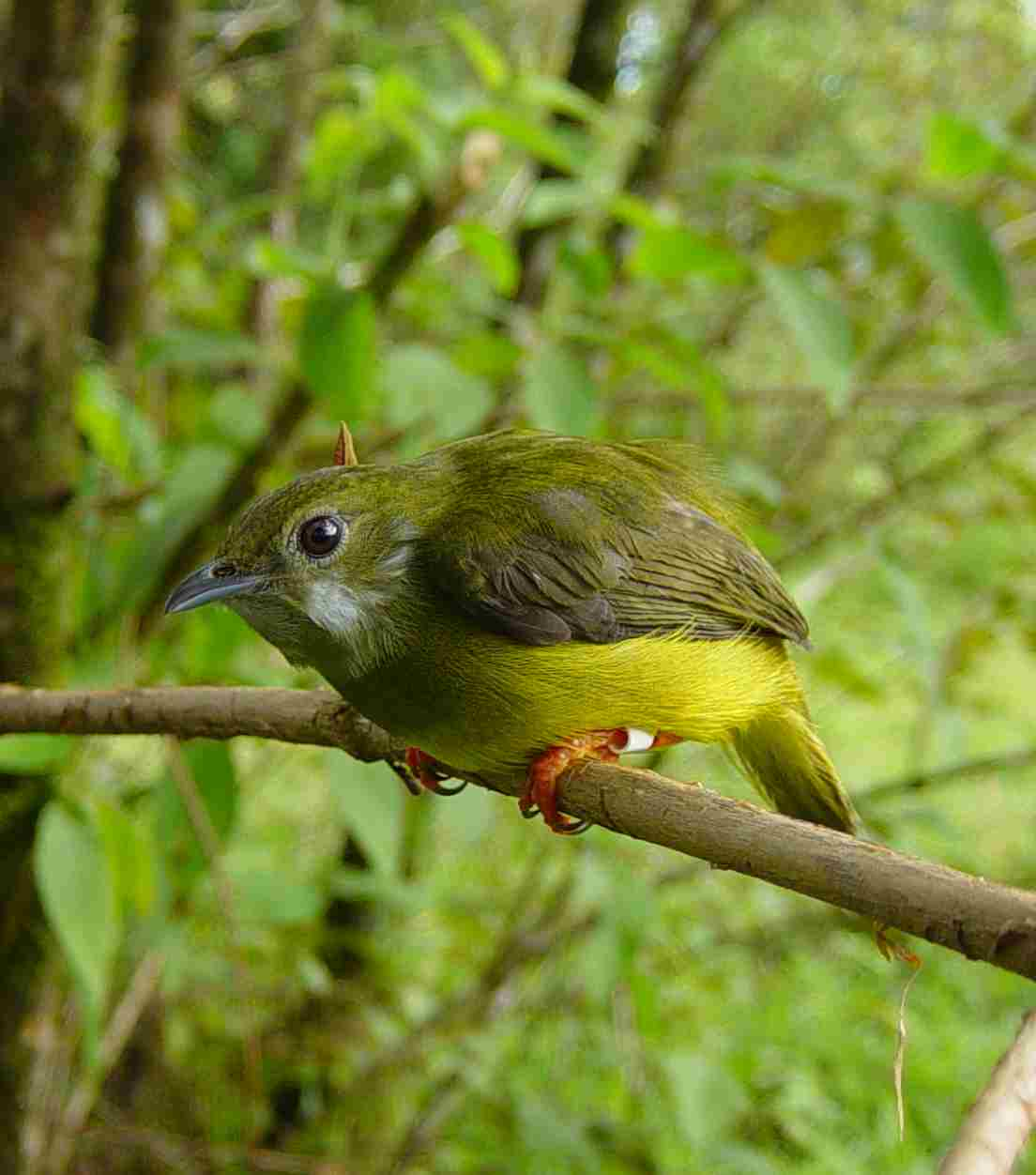
Juvenile

This is a bird of thickets at the edges of moist forest, tall second growth and old cacao plantations.

== Description ==
The white-collared manakin is, like its relatives, a compact short-tailed bird with a heavy hooked bill, orange legs and brightly coloured male plumage. It is typically 11 cm long and weighs 18.5 g.

The adult male has a black crown, wings and tail, and a black band across the midback. The rest of the head, neck, breast and upper back are white, the rump is olive-green, and the belly is bright yellow.

The male wings are heavily modified, with the five outer primaries very narrow for their outer half, and the inner primaries thickened and bowed. This feature is shared only by the male orange-collared and golden-collared manakins. The male's call is a rolled preew, and the wings are used to make a loud snap like a breaking twig, as with other manakins, and various rustling and whiffling noises produced by the modified wings.

The female and young males are olive-green with a yellow belly. They are very similar to female orange-collared manakin, but there is no range overlap.

== Ecology ==
Like other manakins, this species has a fascinating breeding display at a communal lek. Each male clears a patch of forest floor up to 120 cm across to bare earth, and leaps to and fro between thin upright bare sticks, giving a loud wing snap. When a female is present males jump together, crossing each other above the bare display court. The throat feathers are also erected to form a beard. The female lays two brown-speckled white eggs in a shallow cup nest 1–3 m high in a horizontal tree fork. Nest-building, incubation for 18–21 days, and care of the young are undertaken by the female alone, since manakins do not form stable pairs.

The white-collared manakin feeds low in the trees on fruit and some insects, both plucked from the foliage in flight.

== Status ==
This bird has a very wide range, is fairly common and is presumed to have a large total population. The population trend is thought to be stable and the International Union for Conservation of Nature has rated the bird's conservation status as being of "least concern".
