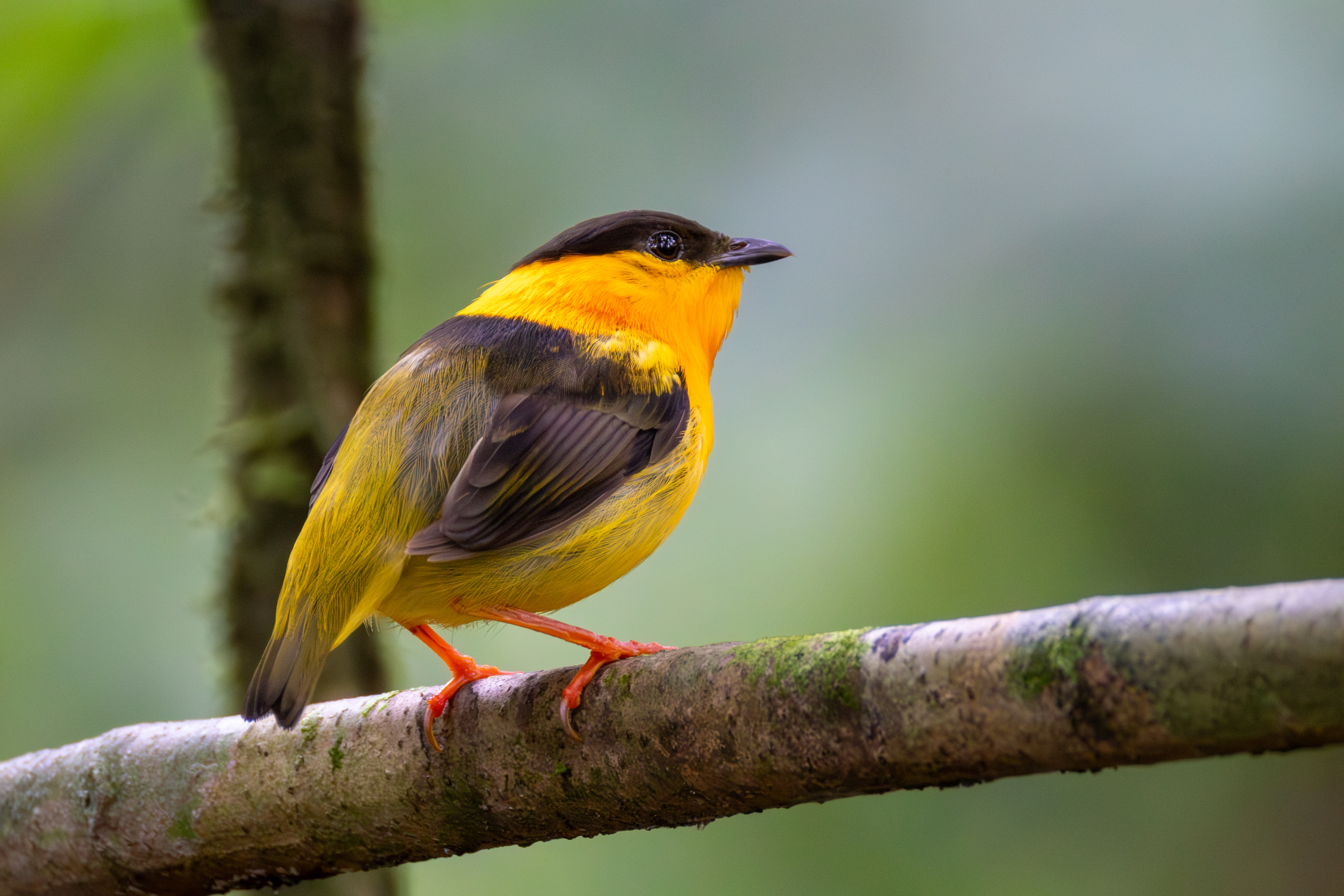
- Orange-collared Manakin in Costa Rica

Conservation status
- Least Concern (IUCN 3.1)

Scientific classification
- Kingdom: Animalia
- Phylum: Chordata
- Class: Aves
- Order: Passeriformes
- Family: Pipridae
- Genus: Manacus
- Species: M. aurantiacus

Binomial name
- Manacus aurantiacus (Salvin, 1870)

= Orange-collared manakin =

Species of bird

The orange-collared manakin (Manacus aurantiacus) is a passerine bird in the manakin family. It is an endemic resident breeder in Costa Rica and western Panama, where it is found in forests, secondary growth and plantations. It is a small, plump bird about 10 centimetres (4 in) long. Males have a black crown, mid back, wings and tail and an olive-green rump. The rest of the head, neck, breast and upper back are orange, and the belly is yellow. Females are olive-green with yellow underparts and resemble female white-collared manakins. At breeding time, males are involved in lekking behaviour on the forest floor. This is a fairly common species with a somewhat restricted range, and the International Union for Conservation of Nature has rated its conservation status as being of "least concern".

== Description ==
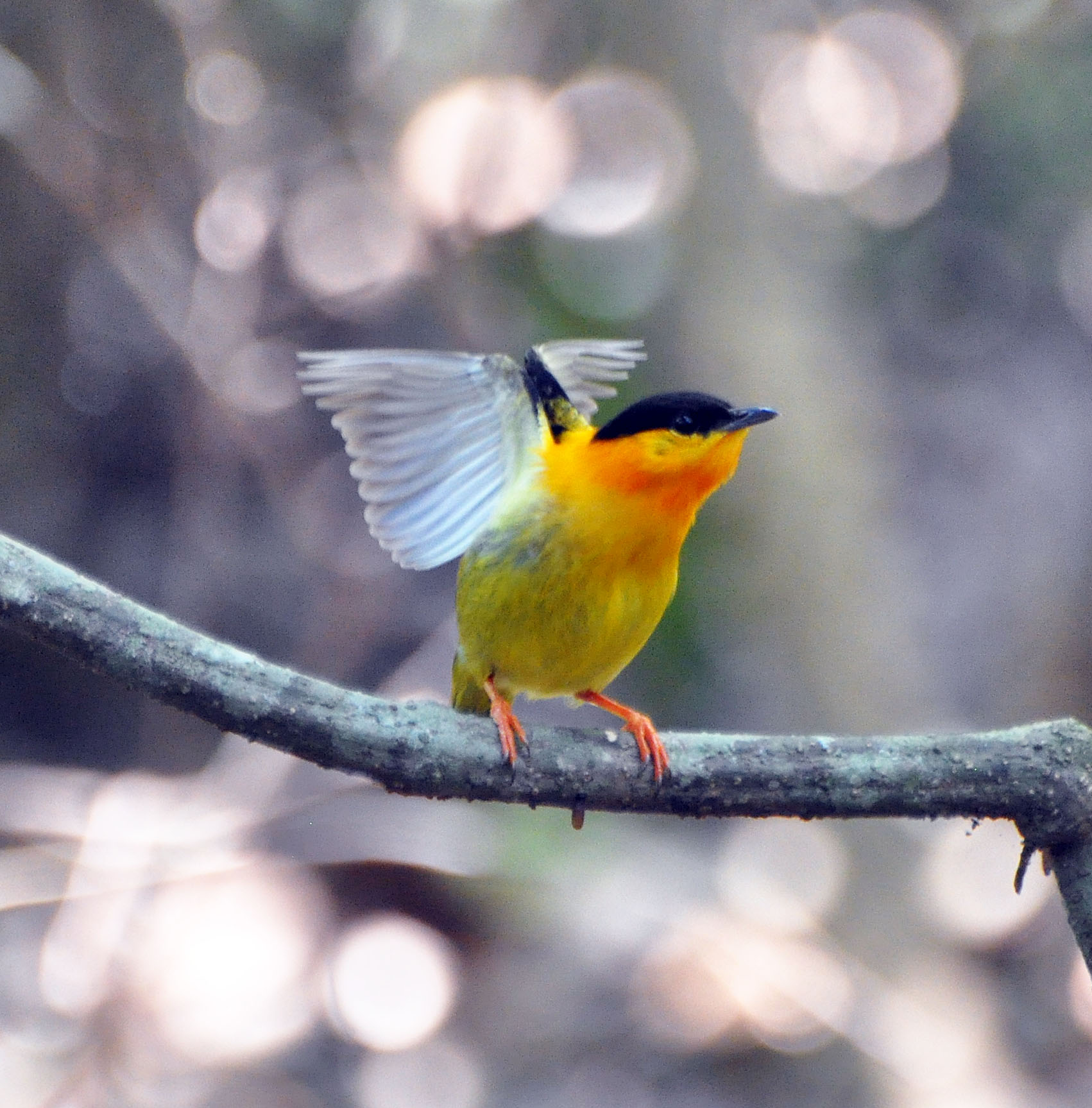
Male in Carara National Park, Costa Rica

The orange-collared manakin is, like its relatives, a compact short-tailed bird with a heavy hooked bill, orange legs and brightly coloured male plumage. It is typically 10 cm long and weighs 15.5 g.

The adult male has a black crown, wings and tail, and a black band across the midback. The rest of the head, neck, breast and upper back are orange, the rump is olive-green, and the belly is bright yellow.

The male wings are heavily modified, with the five outer primaries very narrow for their outer half, and the inner primaries thickened and bowed. This feature is shared only by the male White-collared and golden-collared manakins. The male's call is a clear cheeuu, and the wings are used to make a loud snap like a breaking twig, as with other manakins, and various rustling and whiffling noises produced by the modified wings.

The female and young males are olive-green with a yellow belly. They are very similar to female white-collared manakin, but there is no range overlap. First-year males have a golden tinge to the breast.

== Distribution and habitat ==
It occurs in the lowlands and foothills of the Pacific slope up to 1100 m, being replaced on the Caribbean slopes of tropical Central America by the closely related white-collared manakin, M. candei, and eastwards of its range to northwestern Colombia by the golden-collared manakin, Manacus vitellinus, of which was formerly considered a subspecies. This is a bird of semi-open moist forest, tall secondary growth, shady plantations and gardens.

== Ecology ==
Like other manakins, this species has a fascinating breeding display at a communal lek. Each male clears a small patch of forest floor up to 120 cm across to bare earth, and leaps to and fro between thin upright bare sticks, giving a loud wing snap. When a female is present males jump together, crossing each other above the bare display court. The throat feathers are also erected to form a beard. The female lays two brown-speckled grey eggs in a shallow cup nest 0.5–2.5 m high in a horizontal tree fork. Nest-building, incubation for 18–21 days, and care of the young are undertaken by the female alone, since manakins do not form stable pairs.

The orange-collared manakin feeds low in the trees on fruit and some insects, both plucked from the foliage in flight.

== Status ==
This bird has a somewhat restricted range but is fairly common. The population trend is thought to be slowly decreasing owing to the destruction of its habitat, nevertheless, the International Union for Conservation of Nature has rated the bird's conservation status as being of "least concern".
