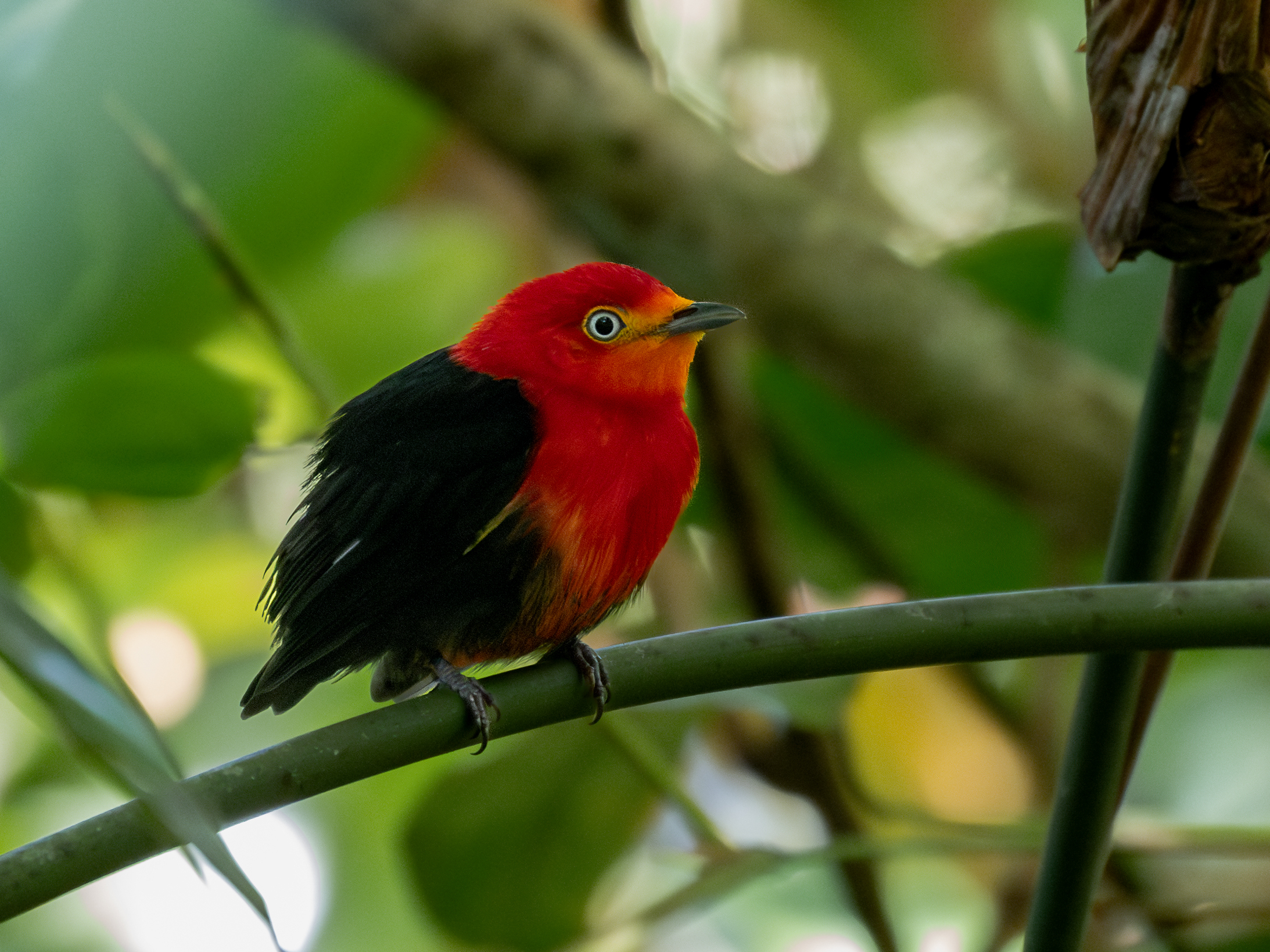
- Male
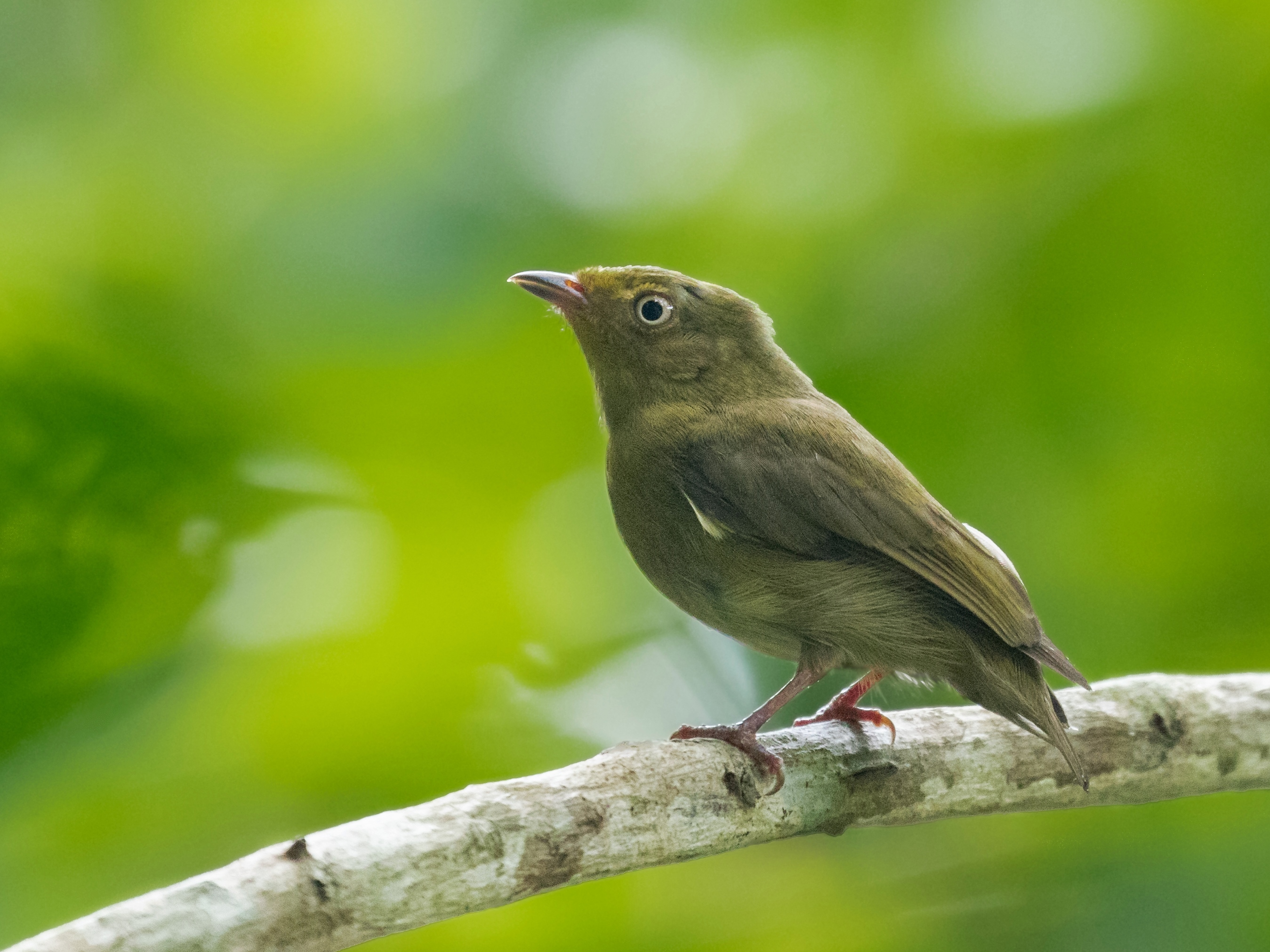
- Female

Conservation status
- Least Concern (IUCN 3.1)

Scientific classification
- Kingdom: Animalia
- Phylum: Chordata
- Class: Aves
- Order: Passeriformes
- Family: Pipridae
- Genus: Pipra
- Species: P. aureola

Binomial name
- Pipra aureola (Linnaeus, 1758)

Synonyms
- Parus aureola Linnaeus, 1758

= Crimson-hooded manakin =

Species of bird

The crimson-hooded manakin (Pipra aureola), also known as orange-headed manakin, is a species of passerine bird in the family Pipridae. It is found in Brazil, French Guiana, Guyana, Suriname, and Venezuela.

== Taxonomy and systematics ==
The crimson-hooded manakin was formally described in 1758 by the Swedish naturalist Carl Linnaeus in the tenth edition of his Systema Naturae under the binomial name Parus aureola. Linnaeus partly based his account on "The Black and Yellow Manakyn" that had been described and illustrated in 1747 by English naturalist George Edwards in his book A Natural History of Uncommon Birds. Linnaeus specified the type locality as America, but this was restricted to Suriname by the Austrian ornithologist Carl Eduard Hellmayr in 1906. The specific epithet is from Latin aureolus meaning "golden" or "brilliant". The crimson-hooded manakin is now placed together with the band-tailed manakin (P. fasciicauda) and the wire-tailed manakin (P. filicauda) in the genus Pipra that was introduced by Linnaeus in 1764. The species forms a superspecies with its two congeners.

The crimson-hooded manakin has these four subspecies:

- P. a. aureola (Linnaeus, 1758)
- P. a. borbae Zimmer, JT, 1936
- P. a. aurantiicollis Todd, 1925
- P. a. flavicollis Sclater, PL, 1852

Some authors suggest that P. a. borbae and P. a. aurantiicollis should be merged with the nominate subspecies P. a. aureola due to their very similar plumage.

== Description ==
The crimson-hooded manakin is about 11 cm (4.3 in) long and weighs 14 to 18.5 g (0.49 to 0.65 oz). The species is sexually dimorphic. Adult males of the nominate subspecies have an orange-yellow face and throat; the rest of their head, nape, and upper mantle are crimson. The crimson extends down the breast to the belly. The rest of its plumage is mostly black, with creamy to whitish thighs and a reddish to orange vent area. They have a white or whitish iris. Adult females have a mostly olive-green head, upperparts, wings, and tail. Their lores and throat have a yellowish tinge. Their breast is olive-green with diffuse yellowish streaks; the rest of their underparts are grayish that is lightest on the belly. They have a pale gray iris. Both sexes have a blackish bill with some pale gray on the mandible and pink or purplish pink legs and feet. Immature males have a dark iris but otherwise resemble adult females.

Males of subspecies P. a. flavicollis have a narrower yellow band from the lores to the eye than the nominate, and the yellow of their throat extends further into the upper breast. P. a. borbae has more and better defined yellow on the forehead than P. a. flavicollis. P. a. aurantiicollis has a very narrow yellow forehead band and a somewhat deeper yellow on the throat than the other subspecies.

== Distribution and habitat ==
The crimson-hooded manakin has a curious distribution from eastern Venezuela to the Atlantic and then inland along the Amazon and Madeira rivers. The nominate subspecies is the northernmost and has the largest range of the four. It is found in Venezuela from Sucre south to far eastern Amazonas though only thinly south of Delta Amacuro. Its range extends slightly east from Amazonas into Brazil's Roraima state and from northeastern Venezuela east across the Guianas to the mouth of the Amazon in Brazil's Amapá and Pará states and slightly up the Amazon to the Xingu River. Subspecies P. a. aurantiicollis's range extends in Pará west along the lower middle Amazon from the Xingu to the Tapajós River. The range of P. a. flavicollis extends west from there along the Amazon to the Negro River. P. a. borbae is found along the Madeira River in Amazonas state from Humaitá north to near the Amazon at Borba.

The crimson-hooded manakin inhabits a variety of landscapes, most of which are wet. These include várzea forest, woodlands along watercourses, and the undergrowth of secondary forest. The nominate subspecies is also found in coastal mangroves, and in Amapá on campina forest on white sand. In parts of Venezuela it also occurs in somewhat drier hilly areas but usually near swamps or otherwise wet areas. In Venezuela it mostly occurs in elevation between sea level and 150 m (500 ft) though near Cerro Roraima, a tepui in Amazonas, it reaches 1,200 m (3,900 ft). In Brazil it is found from sea level to about 300 m (1,000 ft).

== Behavior ==
=== Movement ===
The crimson-hooded manakin is a year-round resident.

=== Feeding ===
The crimson-hooded manakin feeds mostly on fruits, especially those of Araceae (arums). It also feeds on insects and spiders. It plucks fruit and arthropods while perched and also takes them with short sallies from the perch.

=== Breeding ===
The crimson-hooded manakin's breeding season varies geographically, occurring between February and March in Guyana, in October and from March to May in Suriname, and between October and May in French Guiana. Its season(s) in Venezuela and Brazil are not known. Males make a complex courtship display to females in a lek but only the dominant male mates. The perched display includes sliding side-to-side and back-and-forward. Other elements include facing away from a rival, cocking the tail, and shivering the wings. Birds also make both slow and fast swooping flights between perches. They make a variety of calls both when perched and in flight. The species' nest is a small open cup that usually in the fork of a branch about 1 m (3 ft) above the ground in a shrub. The clutch is two eggs. The incubation period, time to fledging, and details of parental care are not known.

=== Vocal and non-vocal sounds ===
Male crimson-hooded manakins make "a plaintive, somewhat drawn-out eeeeew" while perched, and also a "sharper, double chee-weep". Their wings make a "soft poop" at the lowest swoop of the display flight and a "click" when they land.

== Status ==
The IUCN has assessed the crimson-hooded manakin as being of Least Concern. It has a large range; it population size is not known and is believed to be decreasing. No immediate threats have been identified. It is considered local in Venezuela and fairly common in Brazil. It is "locally abundant in Guianan coastal areas".
