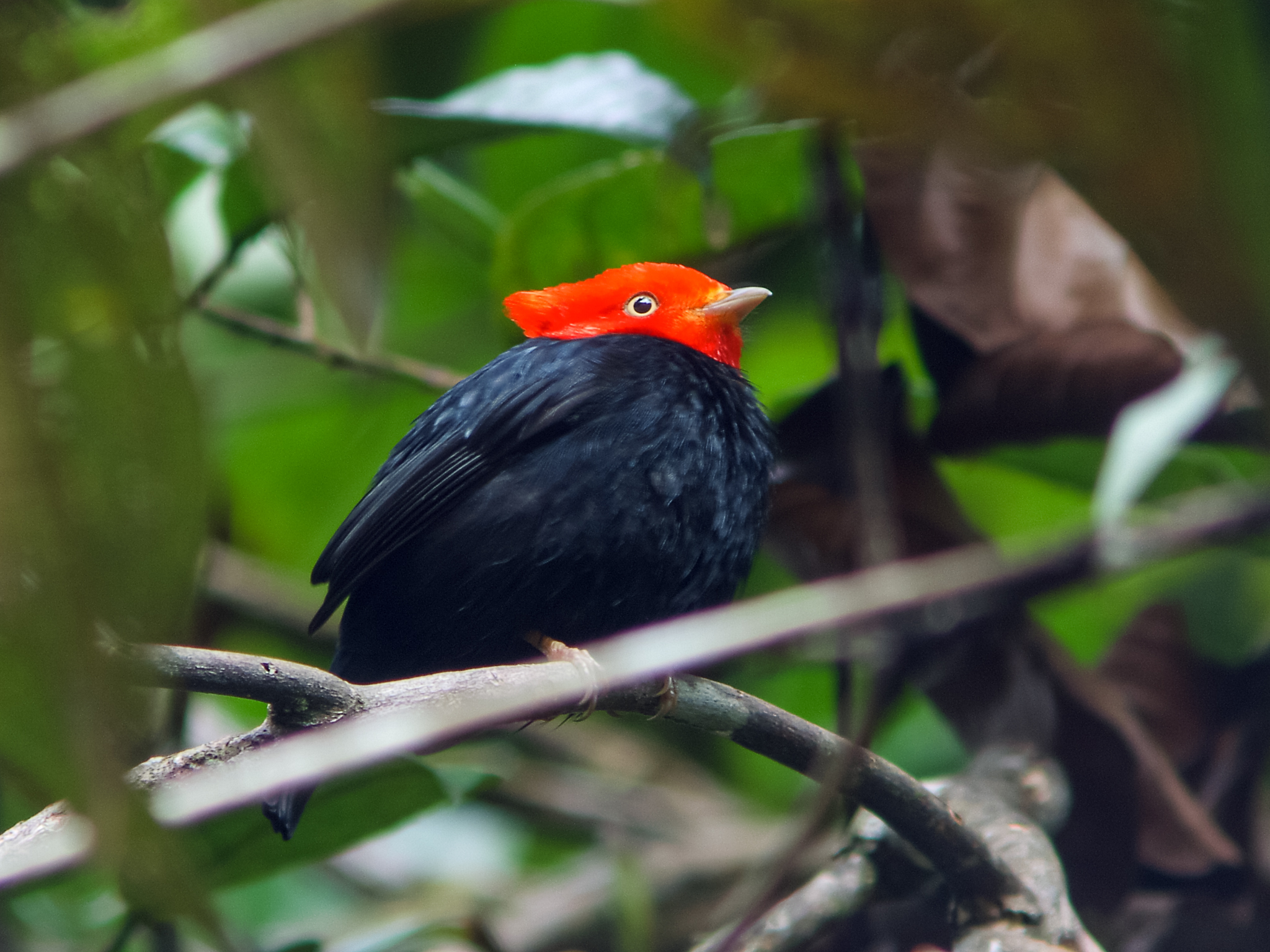
- Male

Conservation status
- Least Concern (IUCN 3.1)

Scientific classification
- Kingdom: Animalia
- Phylum: Chordata
- Class: Aves
- Order: Passeriformes
- Family: Pipridae
- Genus: Ceratopipra
- Species: C. cornuta

Binomial name
- Ceratopipra cornuta (Spix, 1825)

= Scarlet-horned manakin =

Species of bird

The scarlet-horned manakin (Ceratopipra cornuta) is a species of bird in the family Pipridae. It is found in Brazil, Guyana, and Venezuela.

== Taxonomy and systematics ==
The scarlet-horned manakin was originally described as Pipra cornuta. Though its present genus Ceratopipra had been erected in 1854, the scarlet-horned manakin was not transferred to it until the early 2000s.

The scarlet-horned manakin is monotypic.

== Description ==
The scarlet-horned manakin is about 12.5 cm (4.9 in) long; four adult males weighed an average of 23.5 g (0.83 oz). The species is sexually dimorphic. Adult males have an entirely red head and neck. Their hindcrown feathers are elongated and curve slightly upward to form the two eponymous horns. Their thighs are also red. The rest of their plumage is black. Adult females are mostly dull olive-green; their underparts are lighter than their back, especially on the belly. Their hindcrown feathers are elongated but less so than the male's. Both sexes have pink to brownish legs and feet. Males have a white iris and a pale pink bill; females have a darker iris and a browner bill. Immature birds of both sexes resemble adult females but with a dark iris.

== Distribution and habitat ==
The scarlet-horned manakin is found on tepuis in the region where eastern Venezuela, western Guyana's Cuyuni-Mazaruni, and extreme northern Brazil's Roraima meet. In Venezuela it occurs in Amazonas and Bolívar states. The species inhabits humid and forest and mature secondary woodland at elevations between 500 and 1,800 m (1,600 and 5,900 ft).

== Behavior ==
=== Movement ===
The scarlet-horned manakin is a year-round resident.

=== Feeding ===
The scarlet-horned manakin feeds on small fruits, though details are lacking its diet is known to include those of Melastomataceae. It plucks them with short flights from a perch, sometimes with a brief hover.

=== Breeding ===
The scarlet-horned manakin's breeding season appears to center around January to March. Males make a complex courtship display to females in a lek. Its elements include sliding backward on a perch, tail-flicking, rapid flights and, upon landing, turning around and prominently displaying their red thighs. The one known nest was a small open cup in a branch fork. It held two nestlings that the female was feeding.

=== Vocalization ===
The scarlet-horned manakin's "advertisement sound" is "an abrupt crackling or rough-sounding P'R'ROP!" produced by the wings, and has been likened to the sound of an electric bug zapper. Its calls include "a rather squeaky, metallic squee-ke-Slick! [and] a more abbreviated ee'Slick! and Skip!".

== Status ==
The IUCN has assessed the scarlet-horned manakin as being of Least Concern. Its population size is not known and is believed to be stable. No immediate threats have been identified. It is considered fairly common to common in Venezuela and rare in Brazil. "Much suitable habitat remains within its range, and in many areas forest is still effectively inaccessible to major human intrusions."
