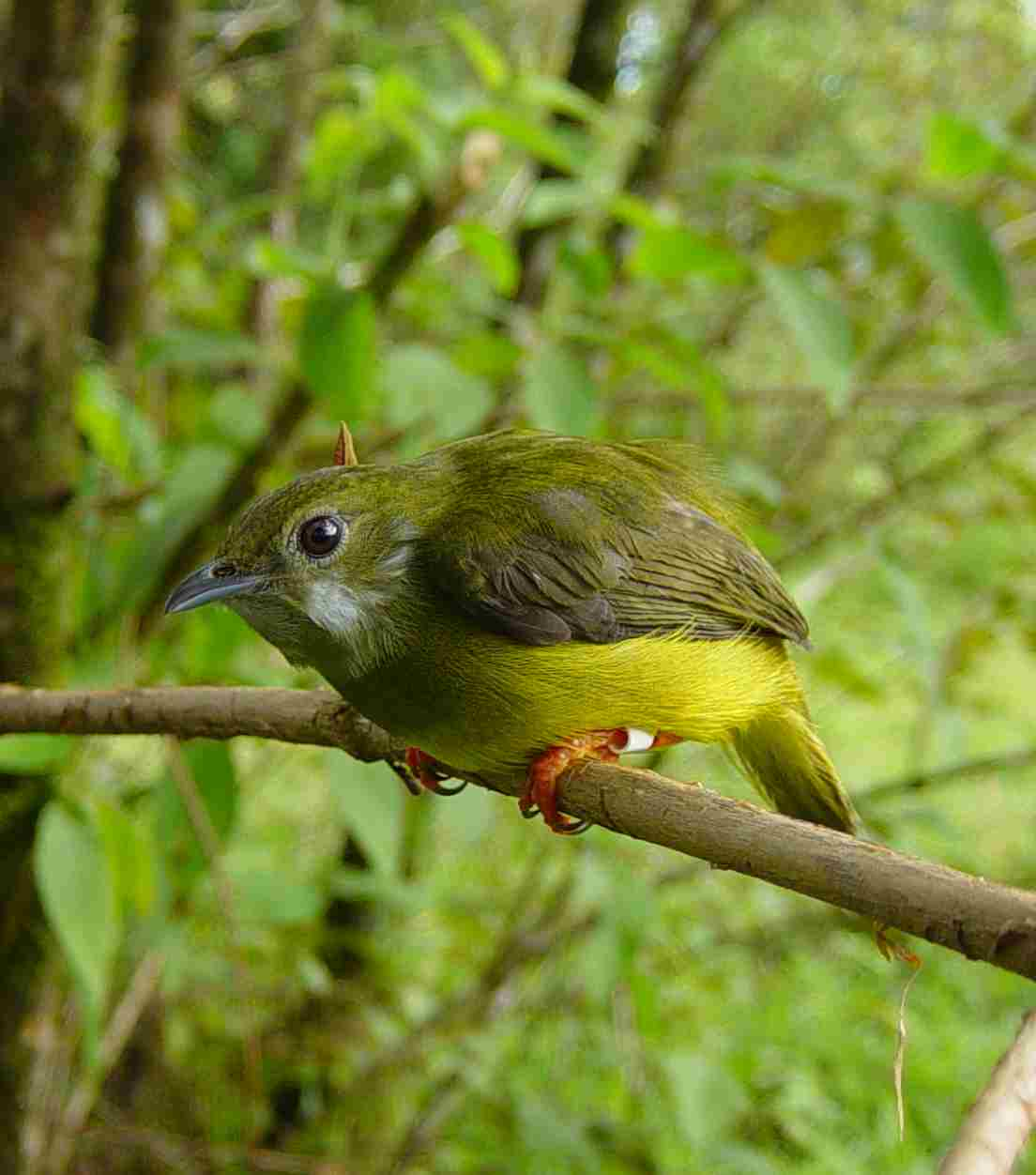
- Juvenile white-collared manakin

Scientific classification
- Kingdom: Animalia
- Phylum: Chordata
- Class: Aves
- Order: Passeriformes
- Family: Pipridae
- Genus: Manacus; Brisson, 1760

Type species
- Pipra manacus Linnaeus, 1766

Species
- see text

= Manacus =

Genus of birds

Manacus is a genus of passerine birds in the manakin family which are found in the forests of tropical mainland Central and South America, and on Trinidad and Tobago.

The genus Manacus was introduced by the French zoologist Mathurin Jacques Brisson in 1760 with the white-bearded manakin (Manacus manacus) as the type species. The name manacus is from the Dutch manneken "pretty little thing".

The genus contains four species:

Image	Scientific name	Common name	Distribution
	Manacus candei	White-collared manakin	Central America
	Manacus aurantiacus	Orange-collared manakin	Panama and Colombia
	Manacus vitellinus	Golden-collared manakin	Colombia and Panama
	Manacus manacus	White-bearded manakin	Colombia, Venezuela and Trinidad south to Bolivia and northern Argentina

The "Almirante manakin" (Manacus x cerritus) are stereotyped hybrids between the white-collared and the golden-collared species, found in Bocas del Toro Province, Panama (Brumfield et al., 2001; McDonald et al., 2001).

These are small, compact, short-tailed birds with a heavy hooked bill and orange legs. The males have brightly coloured plumage and long puffed throat feathers, whereas the females are the typical manakin dull olive hue.

The females lay two eggs in a shallow cup nest in a tree. Nest-building, incubation for 18–21 days, and care of the young are undertaken by the female alone, since manakins do not form stable pairs.

Manacus manakins feed low in the trees on fruit and some insects, both plucked from the foliage in flight.

Like some other manakin species, this genus has spectacular courtship rituals, in which the males give communal displays in a specially prepared lek. The males jump with their throat feathers erected to form a beard, and give whistles together with the characteristic loud snaps (like a breaking twig) and various buzzing, rustling and whiffling noises made with the wings.

The males of three very closely related species, the white-collared manakin of the Caribbean slopes of Central America, and its Pacific counterparts, the orange-collared and golden-collared manakins, have heavily modified wings with the five outer primaries very narrow for their outer half, and the inner primaries thickened and bowed.

== Sources ==
- Brumfield, Robb T.; Jernigan, Robert W.; McDonald, David B.; Braun, Michael J. (2001): Evolutionary implications of divergent clines in an avian (Manacus: Aves) hybrid zone. Evolution 55(10): 2070–2087. PDF fulltext
- McDonald, David B.; Clay, Robert P.; Brumfield, Robb T. & Braun, Michael J. (2001): Sexual selection on plumage and behavior in an avian hybrid zone: experimental tests of male-male interactions. Evolution 55(7): 1443–1451. PDF fulltext
