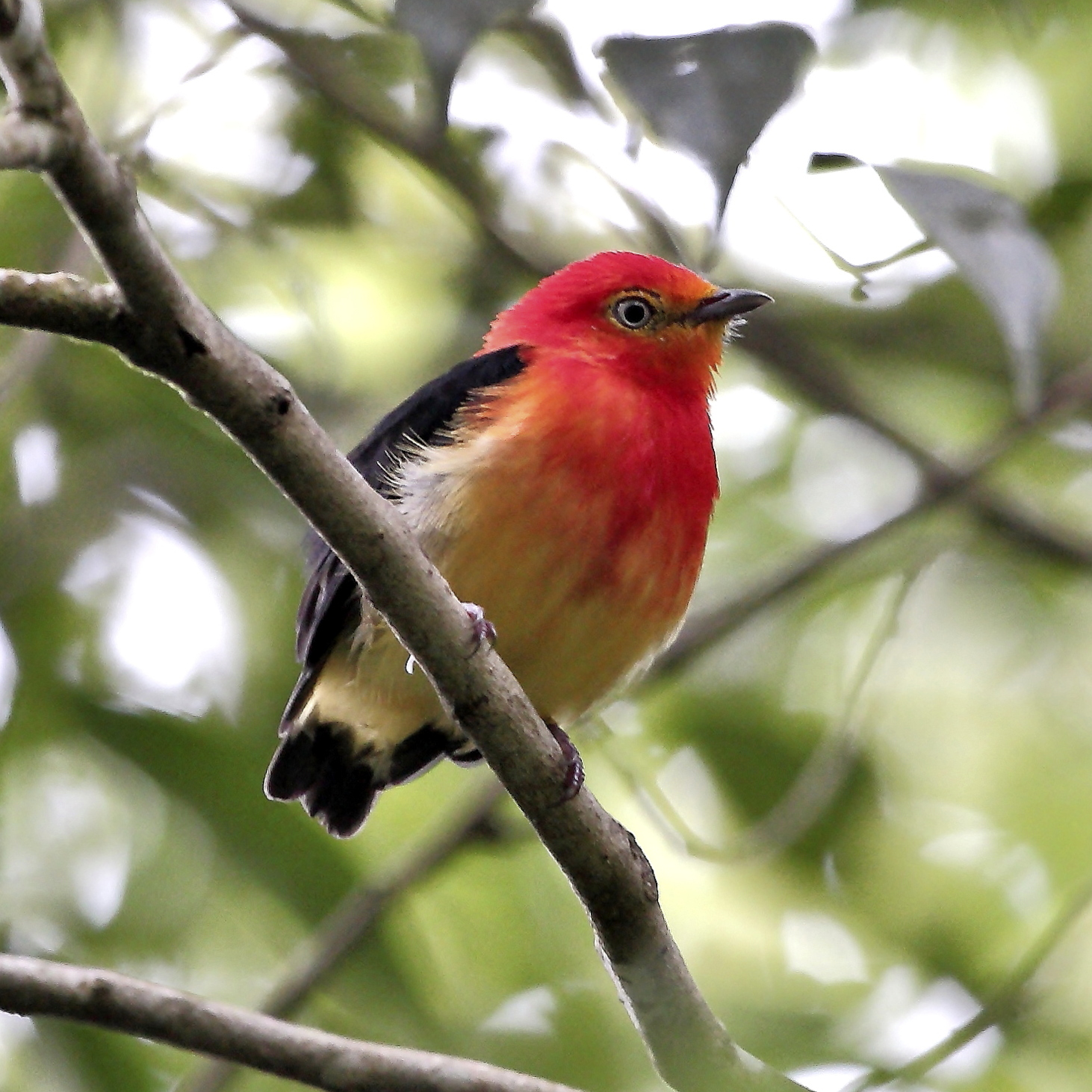
- Male at Guaramiranga, Ceará state, Brazil
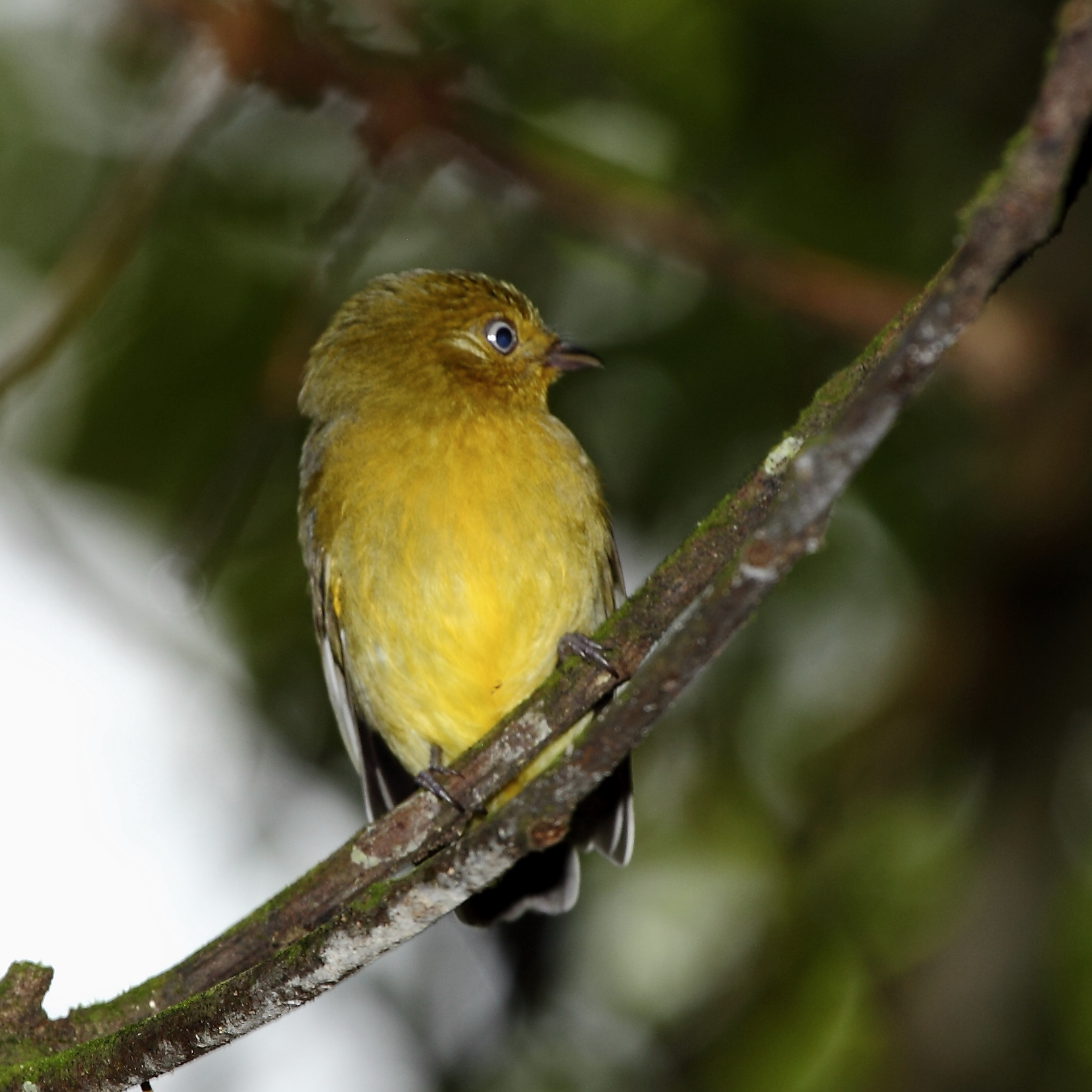
- Female at Guaramiranga, Ceará state, Brazil

Conservation status
- Least Concern (IUCN 3.1)

Scientific classification
- Kingdom: Animalia
- Phylum: Chordata
- Class: Aves
- Order: Passeriformes
- Family: Pipridae
- Genus: Pipra
- Species: P. fasciicauda

Binomial name
- Pipra fasciicauda Hellmayr, 1906

= Band-tailed manakin =

Species of bird

The band-tailed manakin (Pipra fasciicauda) is a species of bird in the family Pipridae. It is a small, frugivorous passerine found in humid montane and lowland tropical forests throughout Argentina, Bolivia, Brazil, Paraguay, and Peru.

== Taxonomy and systematics ==
The band-tailed manakin has these five subspecies:

- P. f. calamae Hellmayr, 1910
- P. f. saturata Zimmer, JT, 1936
- P. f. purusiana Snethlage, E, 1907
- P. f. fasciicauda Hellmayr, 1906
- P. f. scarlatina Hellmayr, 1915

The band-tailed manakin forms a superspecies with its two congeners, the wire-tailed manakin (P. filicauda) and crimson-hooded manakin (P. aureola). The species was described to science by Carl Eduard Hellmayr in 1906. Its average generation length is approximately 3.73 years.

== Description ==
The band-tailed manakin is 10 to 11 cm (3.9 to 4.3 in) long and weighs 11.5 to 19 g (0.41 to 0.67 oz). The species is sexually dimorphic. Adult males of the nominate subspecies P. f. fasciicauda have a yellow face and throat; the rest of their head, nape, and upper mantle are red. The rest of their upperparts, wings, and tail are mostly black. They have a white base to the tail and a white patch on the inner webs of the flight feathers that shows as a stripe in flight. The red of the nape extends onto the breast with some yellow mixed in and the rest of their underparts are light creamy yellow. They have a white or whitish iris. Adult females have a mostly dull olive-green head, upperparts, wings, and tail. Their face and breast have a yellow tinge; their lower breast and belly are grayish that is lightest on the belly. They have a pale gray or magenta to whitish iris. Both sexes have a blackish bill with some pale gray on the mandible, dull reddish legs, and sooty gray feet. Immature males have a brown or gray iris but otherwise resemble adult females. The other subspecies differ little from the nominate. P. f. calamae has slightly more red on its breast, P. f. scarlatina even more and deeper red, and P. f. saturata a nearly entirely red breast and upper belly.

The formative plumage is olive-green overall, with distinct molt limits in the greater coverts. Juvenile feathers are a dull green with some yellow wash. New, larger coverts are a brighter green shade, with denser barbules that protrude 2-3 mm past the old feathers. The iris color ranges from pinkish to white, and the upper mandible of the bill appears gray with a pale base, while the lower mandible of the bill mainly consists of a pale shade.

== Distribution and habitat ==
The band-tailed manakin is a bird of the southern Amazon Basin and the Pantanal. The subspecies are found thus:

- P. f. calamae: west-central Brazil on the upper Madeira River and far northwestern Mato Grosso
- P. f. saturata: Huallaga River watershed in northern Peru's Department of San Martín
- P. f. purusiana: from eastern Peru between Loreto and Cuzco departments east into western Brazil's Acre and western Amazonas states
- P. f. fasciicauda: from Madre de Dios and northern Puno departments in southeastern Peru east into Bolivia's northern Santa Cruz Department
- P. f. scarlatina: central Brazil roughly bounded by central Pará, western Mato Grosso do Sul, southern Goiás, western Minas Gerais, and northwestern São Paulo states extending into far northern Bolivia's Pando and Beni departments and far northeastern Argentina's Misiones Province; also isolated populations in northeastern Brazil's Ceará and Alagoas states.

The band-tailed manakin inhabits lowland várzea and gallery forests. In elevation it reaches 600 m (2,000 ft) in Brazil and 1,000 m (3,300 ft) in Peru.

== Behavior ==
=== Movement ===
The band-tailed manakin is believed to be a year-round resident; no movements have been documented.

=== Feeding ===
Band-tailed manakins are frugivorous passerines, though they have been recorded briefly following swarms of Eciton burchelli army ants. In a study in South Brazil (Mato Grosso do Sul), 93% of band-tailed manakin fecal samples were composed of fruits and seeds, with the remaining 7% being insect remains.

=== Breeding ===
The band-tailed manakin breeds mostly between August and November in southern Brazil and somewhat later in the north. Males make a complex courtship display flight to females in a lek but only the dominant male mates. The leks are often in the dense forest understory. The species' nest is a tiny open cup made from fungal rhizomorphs; it is typically built on a base of dead leaves in a branch fork about 2 to 3 m (7 to 10 ft) up in a small tree. The clutch is two eggs. The incubation period, time to fledging, and details of parental care are not known.

=== Vocal and non-vocal sounds ===
Males at a lek make "a downward-inflected eeew [and] a somewhat harsh wee-ee-eeh" calls. During the flight display they make "a prolonged eeeooo" call. Their wings make a "very low-pitched kloop" during the display flight and a "sharp klok" when they land.

=== Hybridization ===
Studies of plumage coloration and genetic variation have investigated hybridization and introgression between the band-tailed manakin and its sister species P. fasciicauda and P. aureola. Research suggests that hybridization in Amazonian birds may occur due to the slow evolution of reproductive isolation, allowing even taxa that diverged millions of years ago to hybridize upon contact.

== Status ==
The IUCN has assessed the band-tailed manakin as being of Least Concern. It has a very large range; it population size is not known and is believed to be decreasing. No immediate threats have been identified. It is considered common in Brazil and fairly common in Peru. It occurs in several protected areas.
