= Ossaea palenquensis =

Conservation status
- Endangered (IUCN 3.1)

Scientific classification
- Kingdom: Plantae
- Clade: Tracheophytes
- Clade: Angiosperms
- Clade: Eudicots
- Clade: Rosids
- Order: Myrtales
- Family: Melastomataceae
- Genus: Ossaea
- Species: O. palenquensis

Binomial name
- Ossaea palenquensis Wurdack

Species of flowering plant

Ossaea palenquensis is a species of plant in the family Melastomataceae. It is endemic to Ecuador.
