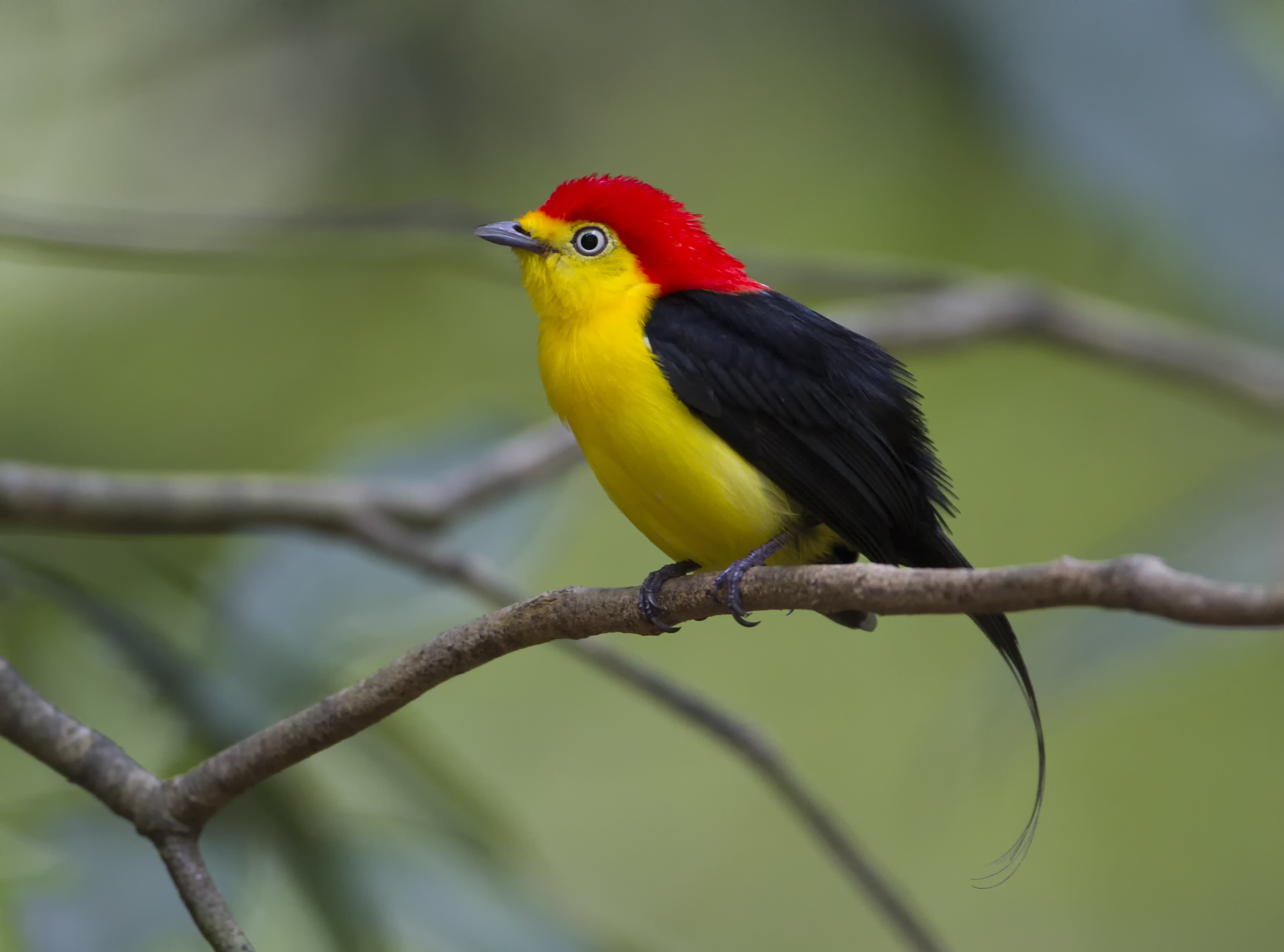
- Male
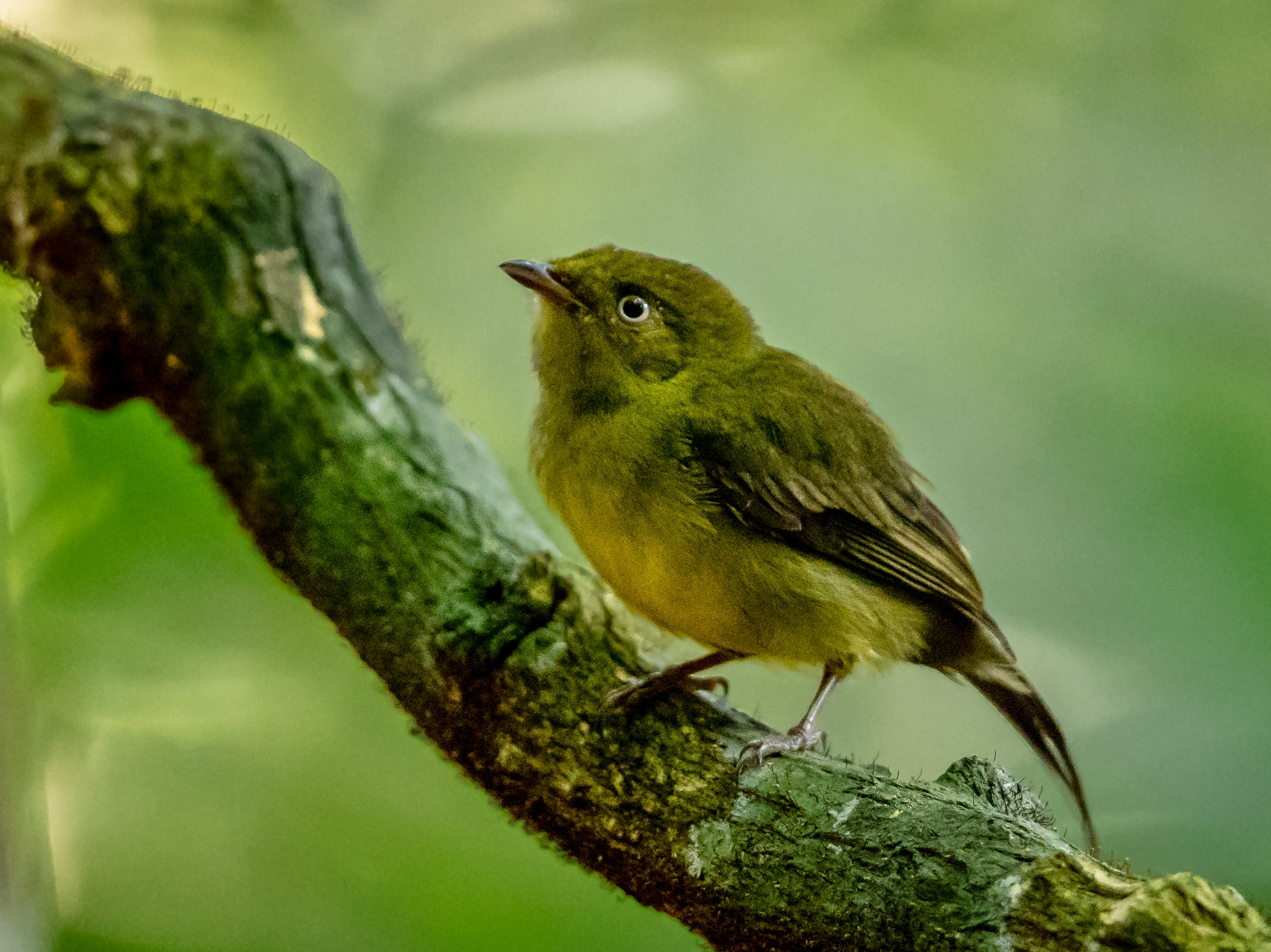
- Female

Conservation status
- Least Concern (IUCN 3.1)

Scientific classification
- Kingdom: Animalia
- Phylum: Chordata
- Class: Aves
- Order: Passeriformes
- Family: Pipridae
- Genus: Pipra
- Species: P. filicauda

Binomial name
- Pipra filicauda Spix, 1825

= Wire-tailed manakin =

Species of bird

The wire-tailed manakin (Pipra filicauda) is a species of bird in the family Pipridae. It is found Brazil, Colombia, Ecuador, Peru, and Venezuela.

== Taxonomy and systematics ==
The wire-tailed manakin has two subspecies, the nominate P. f. filicauda (Spix, 1825) and P. f. subpallida (Todd, 1928). One publication has suggested that the two subspecies should be merged.

During much of the twentieth century several authors placed the wire-tailed manakin in its own genus, Teleonema, but that genus was merged into Pipra starting in the 1970s. The species forms a superspecies with its two congeners, the band-tailed manakin (P. fasciicauda) and crimson-hooded manakin (P. aureola).

== Description ==
The wire-tailed manakin is sexually dimorphic. The species is 11 to 12 cm (4.3 to 4.7 in) long exclusive of the eponymous tail filaments. Male's filaments add about 4 cm (1.6 in) to its length and female's about 2.5 cm (1.0 in). The species weighs an average of about 14 g (0.49 oz). Adult males of the nominate subspecies have a yellow forecrown, face, and throat; the rest of their crown, nape, and sides of the neck are bright red. The rest of their upperparts, wings, and tail are black. Their entire underparts are yellow. They have a white or whitish iris. Adult females have a mostly dull olive-green head, upperparts, wings, and tail. Their face and breast have a yellow tinge; their lower breast and belly are grayish that is lightest on the belly. They have a pale gray or magenta to whitish iris. Both sexes have a blackish bill and sooty reddish legs and feet. Immatures of both sexes resemble adult females but have a brown iris. Subspecies P. f. subpallida is essentially the same as the nominate though males are slightly paler overall.

== Distribution and habitat ==
The nominate subspecies of the wire-tailed manakin is the more northwesterly of the two and has a much smaller range. It is found from east of the Andes in Colombia into western Venezuela on both sides of the Andes. To the north of them its range extends to northeastern Zulia and southern Lara. South of them it extends from Táchira and western Apure northeast to a north-south line roughly from the Federal District and Miranda south to southern Apure. Subspecies P. f. subpallida is found from eastern Ecuador and northeastern Peru (north of the middle Ucayali River) east across western and southern Amazonas in Venezuela into northwestern and central Brazil. There its range extends east north of the Amazon to the Branco and Negro rivers and south of the Amazon to the upper Juruá and middle Purus rivers.

The wire-tailed manakin inhabits a variety of somewhat open landscapes; in all of them it favors areas along watercourses. These include gallery forest, secondary forest, and open woodlands. In Venezuela it also occurs in coffee and cacao plantations. In Colombia and Ecuador it ranges in elevation up to 500 m (1,600 ft). In Venezuela it reaches 1,000 m (3,300 ft) north of the Orinoco River and only to 300 m (1,000 ft) south of it. In Brazil it reaches 600 m (2,000 ft).

== Behavior ==
=== Movement ===
The wire-tailed manakin is a year-round resident.

=== Feeding ===
The wire-tailed manakin feeds primarily on small fruits and also insects. It plucks them while perched and with short flights from a perch.

=== Breeding ===
The wire-tailed manakin's breeding season has not been detailed but includes May and June in northern Venezuela. Males make a complex courtship display flight to females in a lek but only the dominant male mates. Their tail filaments are an important part of the display. The species' nest is a small cup in the fork of a horizontal branch, and usually about 2 to 4 m (7 to 13 ft) up in a small tree near or overhanging a stream. The clutch is two eggs. The incubation period, time to fledging, and details of parental care are not known.

=== Vocal and non-vocal sounds ===
Males at a lek make "a downward-inflected eeew" call. Their wings make a "very low-pitched kloop" during the display flight and a "sharp klok" when they land.

== Status ==
The IUCN has assessed the wire-tailed manakin as being of Least Concern. It has a very large range; it population size is not known and is believed to be stable. No immediate threats have been identified. It is considered fairly common in Colombia, Ecuador, and Peru, "local" in Venezuela, and common in Brazil. It occurs in protected areas in most of its countries.
