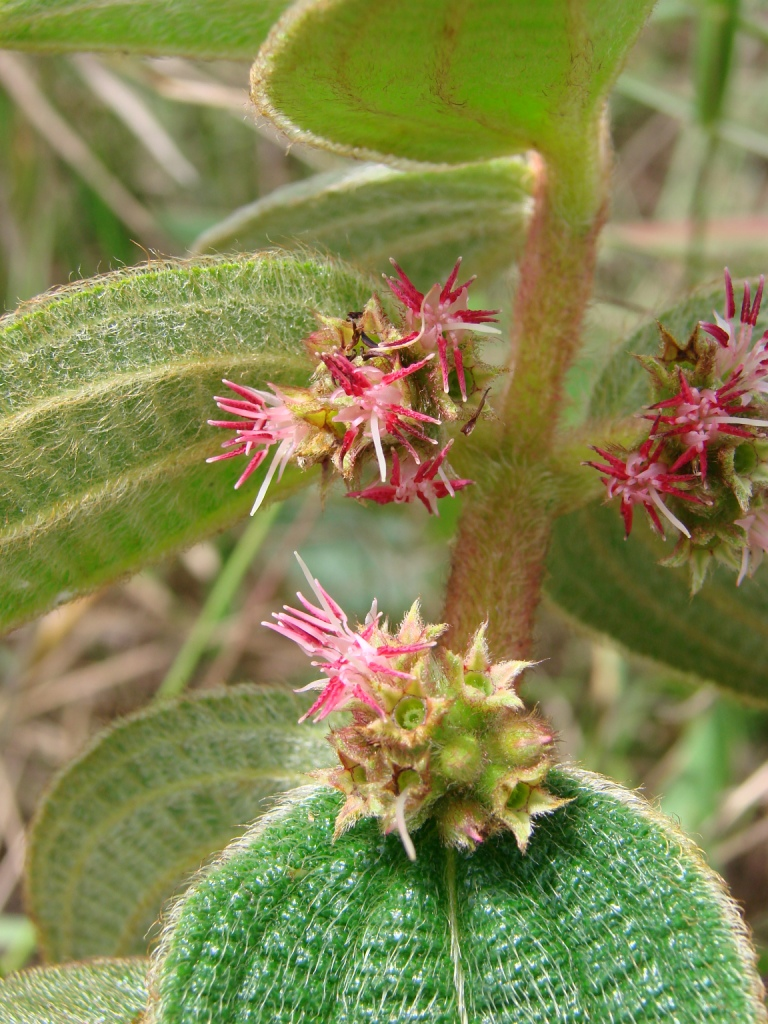
- Ossaea congestiflora

Scientific classification
- Kingdom: Plantae
- Clade: Tracheophytes
- Clade: Angiosperms
- Clade: Eudicots
- Clade: Rosids
- Order: Myrtales
- Family: Melastomataceae
- Genus: Ossaea; DC.

= Ossaea =

Genus of flowering plants

Ossaea is a genus of flowering plants in the family Melastomataceae. There are about 90 species distributed from Mexico to South America and the Caribbean.

Species include:

- Ossaea boekei
- Ossaea incerta
- Ossaea palenquensis
- Ossaea sparrei
