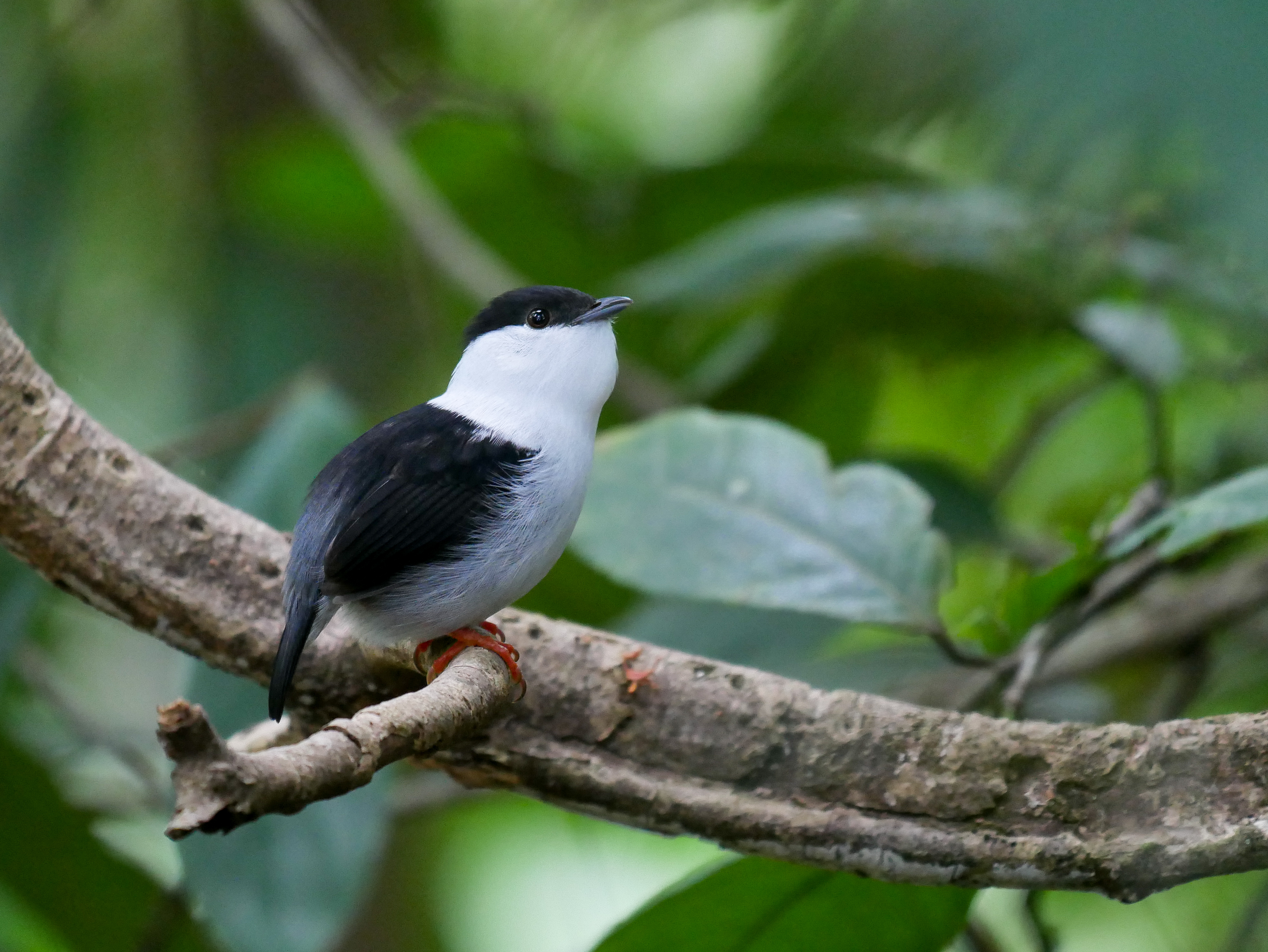
- Male
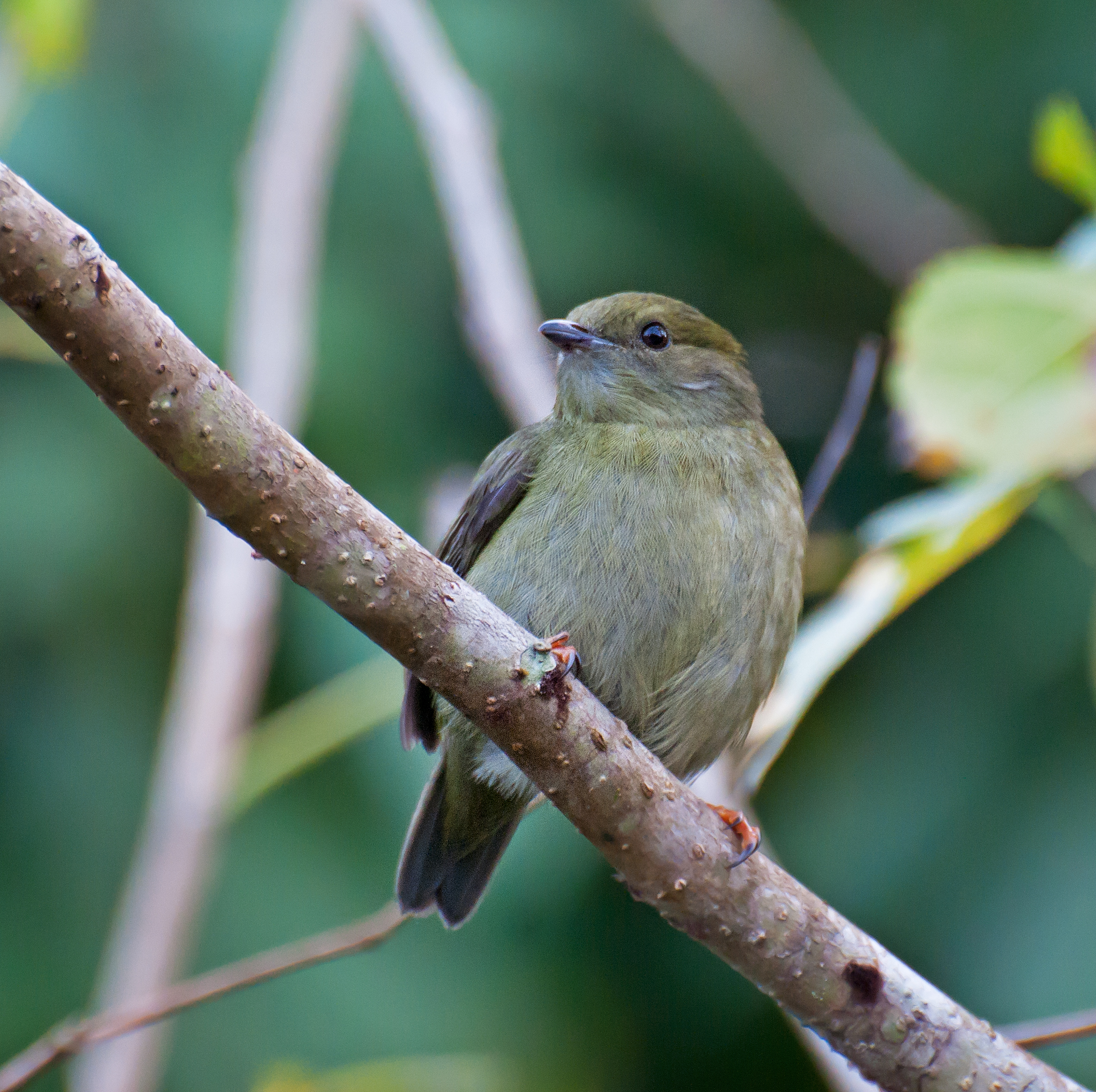
- Female in São Paulo, Brazil

Conservation status
- Least Concern (IUCN 3.1)

Scientific classification
- Kingdom: Animalia
- Phylum: Chordata
- Class: Aves
- Order: Passeriformes
- Family: Pipridae
- Genus: Manacus
- Species: M. manacus

Binomial name
- Manacus manacus (Linnaeus, 1766)

Synonyms
- Pipra manacus Linnaeus, 1766

= White-bearded manakin =

Species of bird

The white-bearded manakin (Manacus manacus) is a small passerine bird which breeds in tropical South America. It can be found in Colombia, Venezuela and Trinidad south to Bolivia and northern Argentina. This manakin is found in forests, secondary growth and plantations. It is a small, plump bird about 10.7 centimetres (4.2 in) long. Males have a black crown, upper back, wings and tail and are otherwise white. Females are olive-green and resemble female golden-headed manakins. At breeding time, males are involved in lekking behaviour on the forest floor during which they puff out their neck feathers. This is a fairly common species with a wide range, and the International Union for Conservation of Nature has rated its conservation status as being of "least concern".

== Description ==
Like other manakins, the white-bearded manakin is a compact, brightly coloured forest bird, typically 10.7 centimetres (4.2 in) long and weighing 16.5 grams (0.58 oz). The adult male has a black crown, upper back, wings and tail, and the plumage is otherwise white. He has orange legs.

The female and young males are olive-green and resemble female golden-headed manakins, but they have orange legs. The race endemic to Trinidad, M. m. trinitatis is larger than mainland birds, and the female has yellower underparts. Apart from the buzzing display song, the white-bearded manakin has a number of other calls, including a trilled musical peeerr.

== Ecology ==
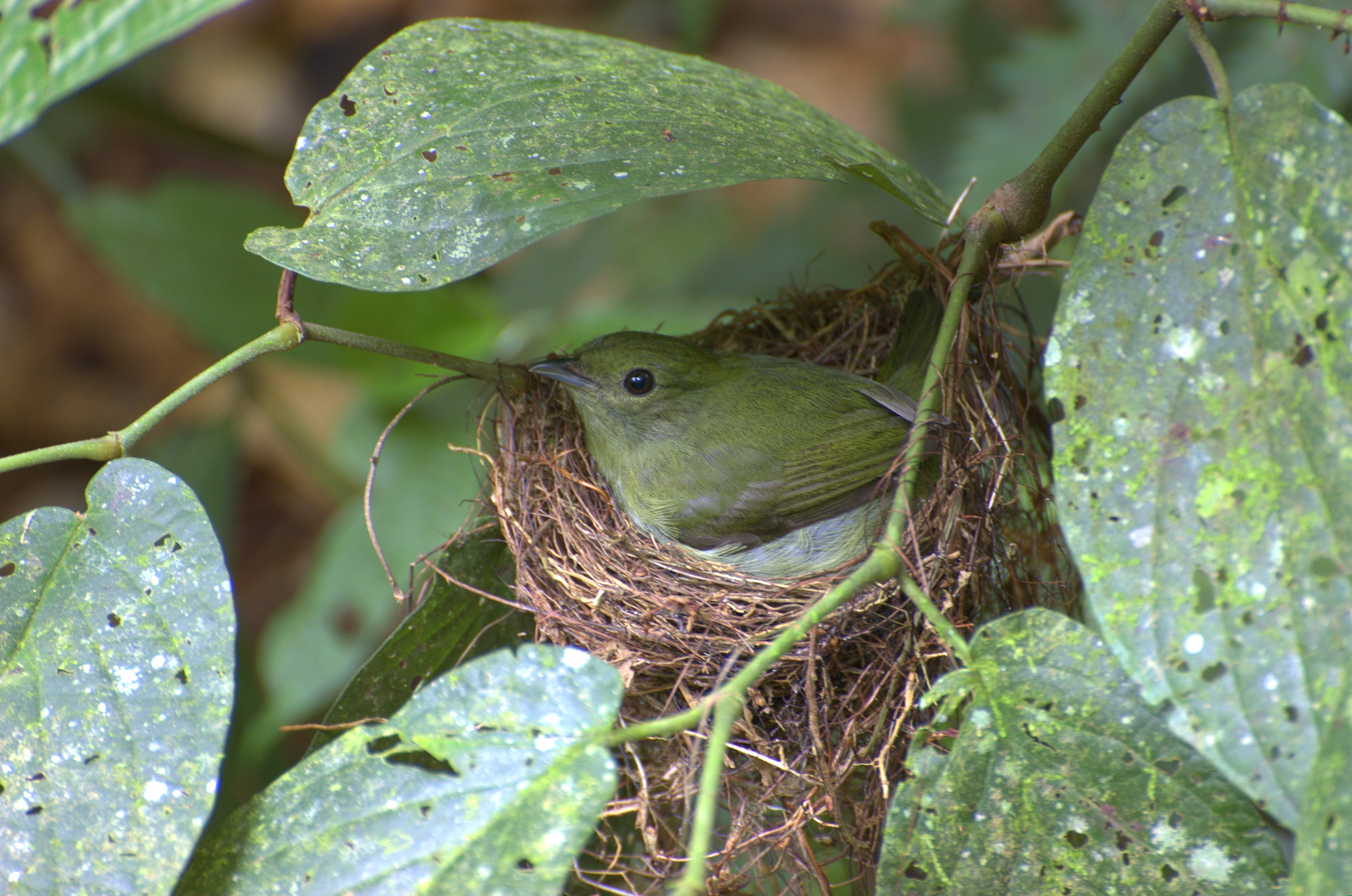
Female on nest in Brazil

These manakins eat fruit and some insects and spiders.

The male white-bearded manakin has a fascinating breeding display at a communal lek. Each male clears a patch of forest floor to bare earth, and perches on a bare stick. The display consists of rapid leaps between sticks and the ground, accompanied by a loud wing snap, the whirring of the wings, and a chee-poo call. Groups of up to 70 birds may perform together, the largest leks being in Trinidad. The female builds a shallow cup nest low in a tree; two brown-mottled white eggs are laid, and incubated entirely by the female for about 18–19 days, with a further 13–15 days to fledging. The young are fed mainly on regurgitated fruit with some insects.

== Distribution ==
In South America, two thirds of white-bearded manakin's range is in the combined Amazon Basin, the Guianas, and the Orinoco River drainage of Venezuela; also eastern Colombia. Three disjunct populations occur: Pacific coastal Ecuador, with southwestern Colombia; coastal and inland western Venezuela with northwestern Colombia; and the largest, southeastern Brazil, with inland regions bordering Paraguay in the south, and from Paraná state to coastal Pernambuco in the northeast.

Only one area of the Amazon Basin does not have the species, the 2200 km Purus River region in southwestern Amazonas state.

== Status ==
This bird has a very wide range, is fairly common and is presumed to have a large total population. The population trend is thought to be stable and the International Union for Conservation of Nature has rated the bird's conservation status as being of "least concern".
