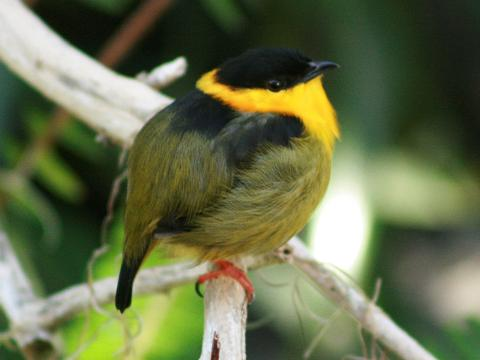

Conservation status
- Least Concern (IUCN 3.1)

Scientific classification
- Kingdom: Animalia
- Phylum: Chordata
- Class: Aves
- Order: Passeriformes
- Family: Pipridae
- Genus: Manacus
- Species: M. vitellinus

Binomial name
- Manacus vitellinus (Gould, 1843)

= Golden-collared manakin =

Species of bird

The golden-collared manakin (Manacus vitellinus) is a species of bird in the family Pipridae. It is found in Colombia and Panama.

== Taxonomy and systematics ==
The golden-collared manakin was originally described in 1843 as Pipra vitellina. It was later assigned to genus Manacus that Carl Linnaeus had erected in 1766.

The further taxonomy of the golden-collared manakin is unsettled. The IOC, the Clements taxonomy, BirdLife International's Handbook of the Birds of the World, and the American Ornithological Society (AOS) treat it as a species with these four subspecies:

- M. v. vitellinus (Gould, 1843)
- M. v. amitinus Wetmore, 1959
- M. v. milleri Chapman, 1915
- M. v. viridiventris Griscom, 1929

The independent South American Classification Committee, formerly part of the AOS, treats the four taxa as subspecies of the widespread white-bearded manakin (M. manacus) as did many other taxonomists during much of the twentieth century. The SACC recognizes that their treatment is probably not correct and is seeking a formal proposal to change it.

This article follows the IOC et al. model.

== Description ==
The golden-collared manakin is about 10 to 12 cm (3.9 to 4.7 in) long and weighs about 15 to 24 g (0.53 to 0.85 oz). The species is sexually dimorphic and males are larger than females. Adult males of the nominate subspecies M. v. vitellinus have a jet black crown, back, wings, and tail. Their chin, throat, and breast are a deep and glossy golden-yellow that also wraps around the nape to form the eponymous collar. The chin and throat feathers are long and can be projected forward. Their lower breast, flanks, belly, and undertail coverts are olive green with a yellow-olive wash on the belly. Adult females are mostly olive green. Their lower breast and belly have a paler yellow-olive wash and their wings and tail are dusky with olive edges on the feathers.

The other subspecies of the golden-collared manakin differ from the nominate and each other thus:

- M. v. amitinus: larger than nominate with a longer tail; male's collar is slightly more lemon-yellow; both sexes' green colors are darker with less yellow wash on female
- M. v. milleri: (male) paler lemon yellow collar and more yellow on the belly than nominate (female) paler green underparts with more yellow on the belly than nominate
- M. v. viridiventris: male's collar like nominate or slightly more lemony; both sexes have a darker olive belly with less yellow; females darker olive overall

Both sexes of all subspecies have a mouse brown to dark brown iris, a black bill, and variably bright orange to dull scarlet legs and feet.

== Distribution and habitat ==
The subspecies of the golden-collared manakin are found thus:

- M. v. vitellinus: Caribbean slope in Panama from Bocas del Toro Province to Colombia and Pacific slope from Veraguas Province to Colombia; in Colombia east into northern Antioquia Department and south to central Chocó Department
- M. v. amitinus: Isla Escudo de Veraguas off Bocas del Toro Province
- M. v. milleri: northern Colombia from Antioquia Department east into Córdoba Department
- M. v. viridiventris: Colombia's Western Andes from Chocó Department south to Cauca and Valle del Cauca departments

The golden-collared manakin inhabits evergreen forest and mature secondary forest in the lowlands and foothills of the tropical zone. It tends to shun the deep interior of the forest and is more common along edges, watercourses, and regenerating clearings. In elevation it ranges from sea level to 1,200 m (3,900 ft).

== Behavior ==
=== Movement ===
The golden-collared manakin is a year-round resident.

=== Feeding ===
The golden-collared manakin feeds mostly on a wide variety of small fruits that it plucks while perched and with short sallies from a perch. It also takes small numbers of insects. It typically feeds within about 6 m (20 ft) of the ground but will go to the canopy of fruiting trees. It rarely joins mixed-species feeding flocks but will loosely associate with other species in a fruiting tree.

=== Breeding ===
The golden-collared manakin's breeding season in Panama extends at least from February to August. Males perform elaborate acrobatic displays and use vocalizations to court females. Males emit a specific chee-poo sound during courtship. Studies have examined whether the call of golden-collared manakins is physiologically controlled by peripheral androgen receptors. When androgen receptors outside of the central nervous system were inhibited, this resulted in an increase in the duration of the chee note and a decrease in the frequency of the poo note. These results show that the activation of peripheral androgen receptors is important for creating a normal sexual call in the golden-collared manakin.

Females alone construct the nest, a shallow open cup of plant fibers such as bark, grass, and rootlets with a finer lining, and attached in a branch fork with spider web. It is typically between about 0.5 and 2 m (2 and 7 ft) above the ground. The clutch is usually two eggs that are whitish or cream with darker markings. The incubation period and time to fledging are not known. Females alone incubate the clutch and provision nestlings.

=== Vocal and non-vocal sounds ===
The male golden-collared manakin's "advertising call" is a "loud, clear, two-parted whistle...whee-you!, chee-poo, or chee-pooh". A more frequent, and more variable, call is a "short whistle...weeer, pee-you, pee-yur, pee-yuk, or with final syllable slightly trilled, pee-a-a, or pee-e-e". Most calling is done at the lek. Males also make a variety of non-vocal sounds, generally called wing-snaps, during displays.

== Status ==
The IUCN has assessed the golden-collared manakin as being of Least Concern. It has a large range; its estimated population of at least 500,000 mature individuals is believed to be decreasing. No immediate threats have been identified. It is "considered one of the most abundant manakins across its range, being common in both Panama and Colombia". It occurs in many protected areas in both countries.
