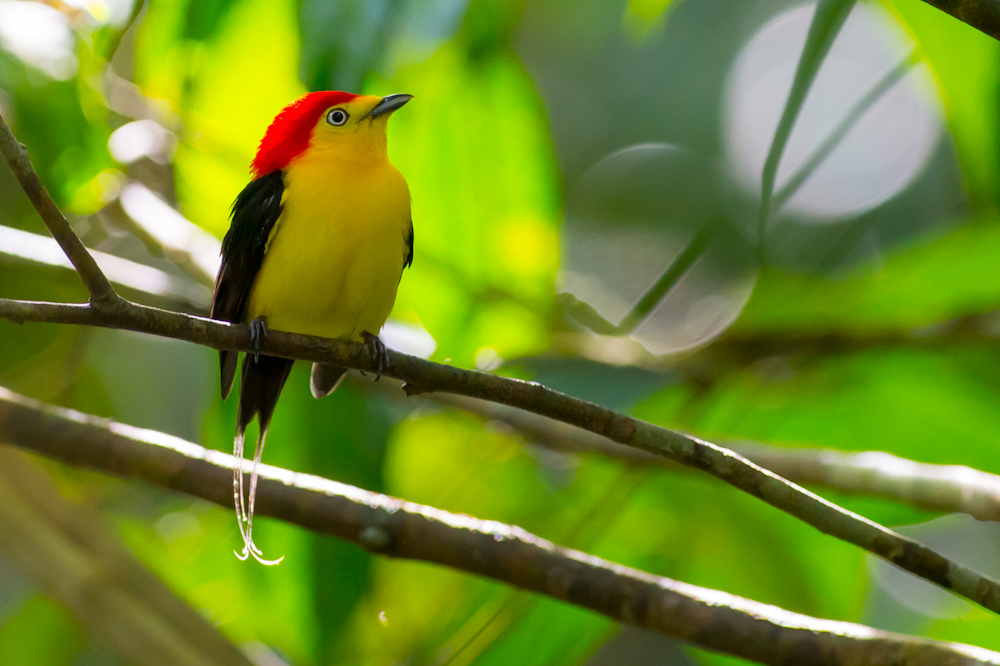
- Wire-tailed manakin Cristalino River, Southern Amazon, Brazil

Scientific classification
- Kingdom: Animalia
- Phylum: Chordata
- Class: Aves
- Order: Passeriformes
- Family: Pipridae
- Genus: Pipra; Linnaeus, 1764

Type species
- Parus aureola Linnaeus, 1758

= Pipra =

Genus of birds

Pipra is a genus of birds in the manakin family Pipridae.

== Taxonomy and species list ==
The genus Pipra was introduced by the Swedish naturalist Carl Linnaeus in 1764. The name was used by Ancient Greek authors such as Aristotle for a small bird but it is unclear which species it referred to. The type species was designated as the crimson-hooded manakin in 1840 by the English zoologist George Robert Gray.

The genus contains three species:

Genus Pipra – Linnaeus, 1764 – three species
Common name	Scientific name and subspecies	Range	Size and ecology	IUCN status and estimated population
Crimson-hooded manakin Male Female	Pipra aureola (Linnaeus, 1758)	Brazil, French Guiana, Guyana, Suriname, and Venezuela	Size: Habitat: Diet:	LC
Band-tailed manakin Male Female	Pipra fasciicauda Hellmayr, 1906	Argentina, Bolivia, Brazil, Paraguay, and Peru	Size: Habitat: Diet:	LC
Wire-tailed manakin Male Female	Pipra filicauda Spix, 1825	northern Peru, eastern Ecuador and Colombia, and southern and western portions of Venezuela	Size: Habitat: Diet:	LC
