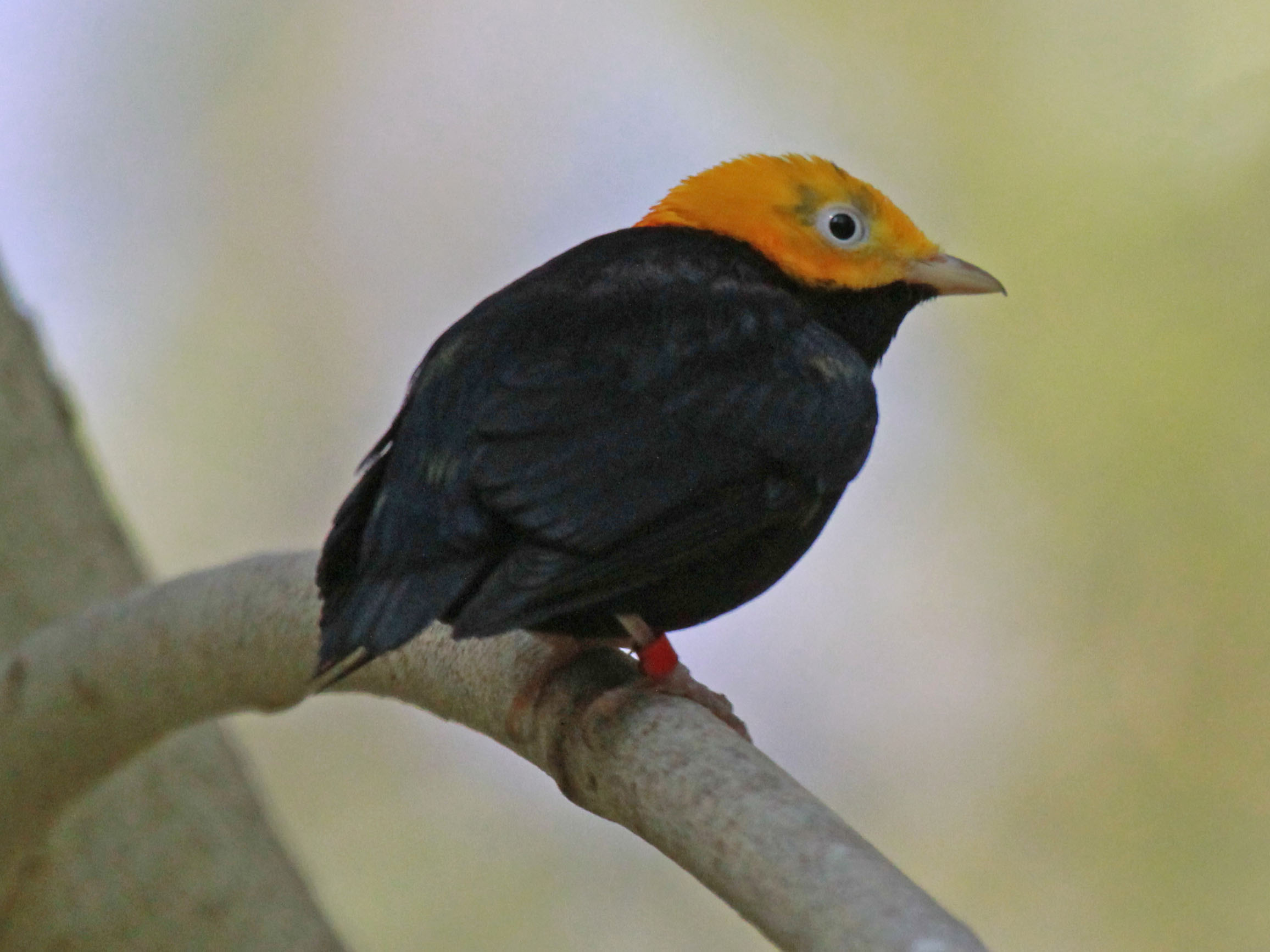
- Adult male

Conservation status
- Least Concern (IUCN 3.1)

Scientific classification
- Kingdom: Animalia
- Phylum: Chordata
- Class: Aves
- Order: Passeriformes
- Family: Pipridae
- Genus: Ceratopipra
- Species: C. erythrocephala

Binomial name
- Ceratopipra erythrocephala (Linnaeus, 1758)

Synonyms
- Parus erythrocephalus Linnaeus, 1758; Dixiphia erythrocephala (Linnaeus, 1758); Pipra erythrocephala Linnaeus, 1766

Audio
- Call recorded in Ecuador

= Golden-headed manakin =

Species of bird

The golden-headed manakin (Ceratopipra erythrocephala) is a small passerine bird which breeds in tropical Central and South America in both wet and dry forests, secondary growth and plantations. It is a small manakin, about 9.4 centimetres (3.7 in) long. Males are entirely black apart from a golden head, yellow bill, white and red thighs and pink legs. Females and juveniles are olive-green with pink legs. At breeding time, males are involved in a cooperative lekking behaviour during which they jump, slide and dart from perch to perch. This is a fairly common species with a wide range, and the International Union for Conservation of Nature has rated its conservation status as being of "least concern".

== Taxonomy ==
The golden-headed manakin was formally described in 1758 by the Swedish naturalist Carl Linnaeus in the tenth edition of his Systema Naturae under the binomial name Parus erythrocephalus. Linnaeus based his account on the "Golden-headed black tit-mouse" that had been described and illustrated in 1743 by the English naturalist George Edwards in his book A Natural History of Uncommon Birds. Edwards had sketched a mounted specimen that belonged to Charles Lennox, the 2nd Duke of Richmond. The Duke believed that his specimen had been collected in the Dutch colony of Surinam in South America. Although Linnaeus specified the type locality as South America, this has been restricted to Suriname. The specific epithet erythrocephala combines the Ancient Greek ερυθρος/eruthros meaning "red" with -κεφαλος/-kephalos meaning "-headed". The golden-headed manakin is now one of five species placed in the genus Ceratopipra that was introduced 1854 by French naturalist Charles Lucien Bonaparte.

Two subspecies are recognised:

- C. e. erythrocephala (Linnaeus, 1758) – east Panama, north Colombia, Venezuela, Trinidad, the Guianas and north Brazil
- C. e. berlepschi (Ridgway, 1906) – east, southeast Colombia, east Ecuador, northeast Peru and northwest Brazil

== Description ==
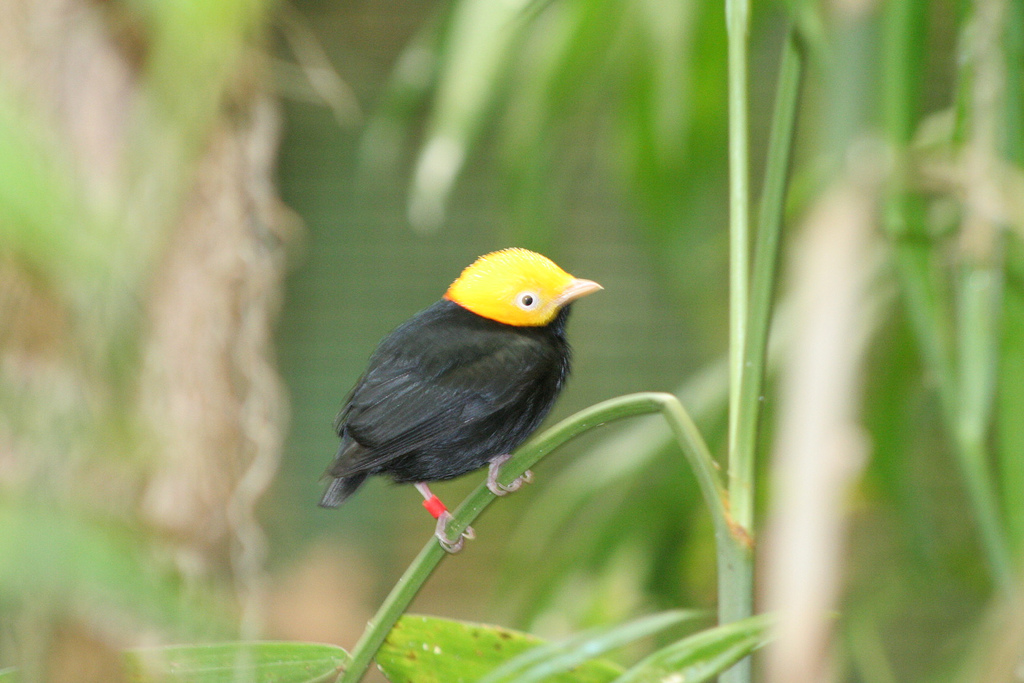
Adult male

Like other manakins, the golden-headed manakin is a compact, brightly coloured forest bird, typically 3.7 in (9.4 cm) long and weighing 0.44 oz (12.5 g). The adult male is black apart from a golden cap, white and red thighs, pink legs and a yellowish bill. The female and young males are olive-green and resemble female white-bearded manakins, but are smaller, shorter-tailed and have pinkish (not bright orange) legs. Apart from the buzzing display song (see below), the golden-headed manakin has a number of other calls, including a buzzing pir pir prrrrrt.

== Distribution and habitat ==
This manakin is found from Panama, Colombia and Trinidad south and east to the Guianas and Brazil and northern Peru. It is not found south of the Amazon or the Ucayali Rivers. It is a common bird of forests, second growth and plantations. Their upper altitudinal limit is usually about 1,100 m (3,600 ft), but they are occasionally found has high as c.1,350 m (4,430 ft) ASL. Like other manakins they eat fruit and some insects and spiders.

== Behaviour and ecology ==
=== Breeding ===
Male golden-headed manakins give a courtship display at a communal lek. Each male occupies a horizontal perch 20–40 ft (6–12 m) high and rapidly jumps, slides, or darts to other perches. The display is accompanied by the whirring of the wings and a buzzing zit-zit call. Groups of up to 12 birds may perform together. The female builds a shallow cup nest low in a tree; two brown-mottled yellowish eggs are laid, and incubated entirely by the female for about 16–17 days.

== Conservation status ==
This bird has a large range and is thus considered a species of Least Concern by the International Union for Conservation of Nature (IUCN).
