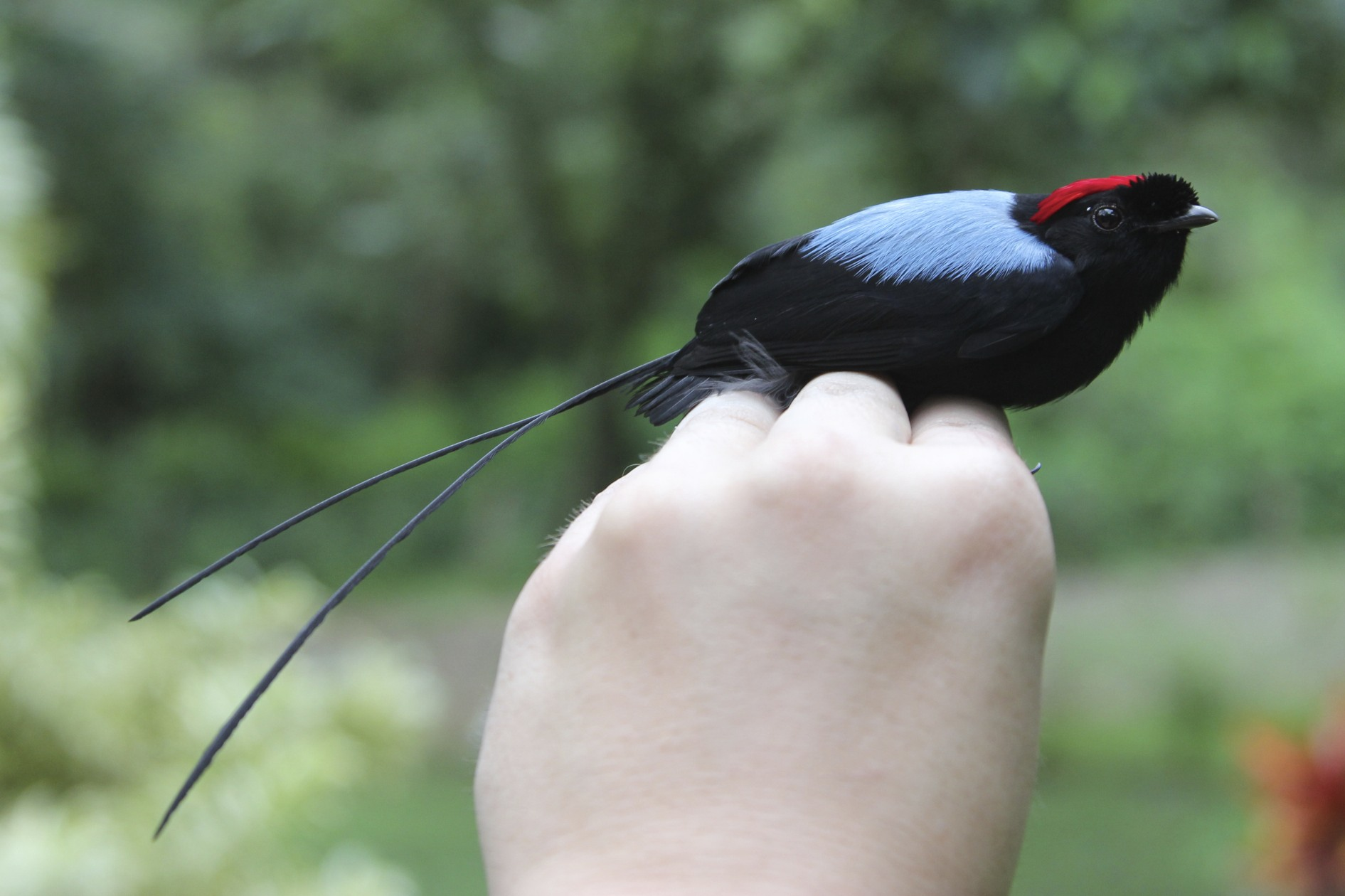

Conservation status
- Least Concern (IUCN 3.1)

Scientific classification
- Kingdom: Animalia
- Phylum: Chordata
- Class: Aves
- Order: Passeriformes
- Family: Pipridae
- Genus: Chiroxiphia
- Species: C. linearis

Binomial name
- Chiroxiphia linearis (Bonaparte, 1838)

= Long-tailed manakin =

Species of bird

The long-tailed manakin (Chiroxiphia linearis) is a species of bird in the family Pipridae native to Central America where it inhabits both wet and dry tropical and subtropical forests. It is a small, plump bird about 10 centimetres (4 in) long. Males have black plumage with a blue back and a red crown, and the two central tail feathers are greatly elongated. Females and juveniles are olive-green with paler underparts. At breeding time, males are involved in a cooperative lekking behaviour with a complex coordinated courtship dance. This is a fairly common species with a wide range, and the International Union for Conservation of Nature has rated its conservation status as being of "least concern".

== Description ==
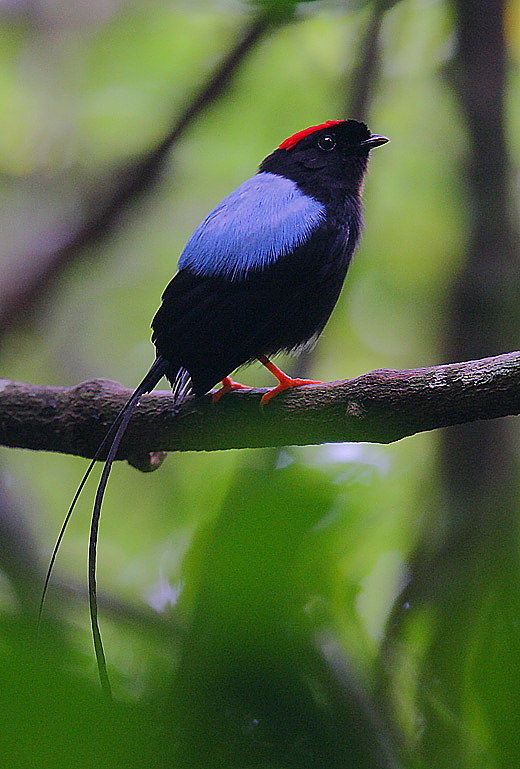

Large for a manakin, the long-tailed measures about 10 cm (3.9 in) long and weighs 18 g (0.63 oz).

The male is mostly a rich black. This is contrasted by a bright red crown and legs. The back is bright blue. The two central tail feathers are narrow and greatly elongated. The female is olive green, paler below and on the chin and throat. Some females have a small amount of red in the crown.

It closely resembles the lance-tailed manakin (C. lanceolata), the blue-backed manakin (C. pareola), the swallow-tailed manakin (C. caudata), and the Yungas manakin (C. boliviana), which all have the same red crown and blue back. There is, however, no overlap in range with these four species.

== Distribution and habitat ==
The long-tailed manakin is found in Costa Rica, El Salvador, Guatemala, Honduras, Mexico, and Nicaragua. Its natural habitats are subtropical or tropical dry forest, subtropical or tropical moist lowland forest, and heavily degraded former forest.

== Ecology ==
The manakin species are very interesting in their family life. Long-tailed manakin males form a long-term partnership duo or trio. Together they sing in synchrony and, for any female who is attracted by their singing, perform a complex coordinated courtship dance. If she mates, only the alpha male inseminates her. Among many displaying male partnerships in a locality (a dispersed lek), only one or a very few males may account for the vast majority of matings in a given breeding season. As in other lekking species, the female then builds the nest and raises the young without involvement by males.

== Status ==
This bird has a very wide range, is fairly common and is presumed to have a large total population. The population trend is thought to be stable and the International Union for Conservation of Nature has rated the bird's conservation status as being of "least concern".
