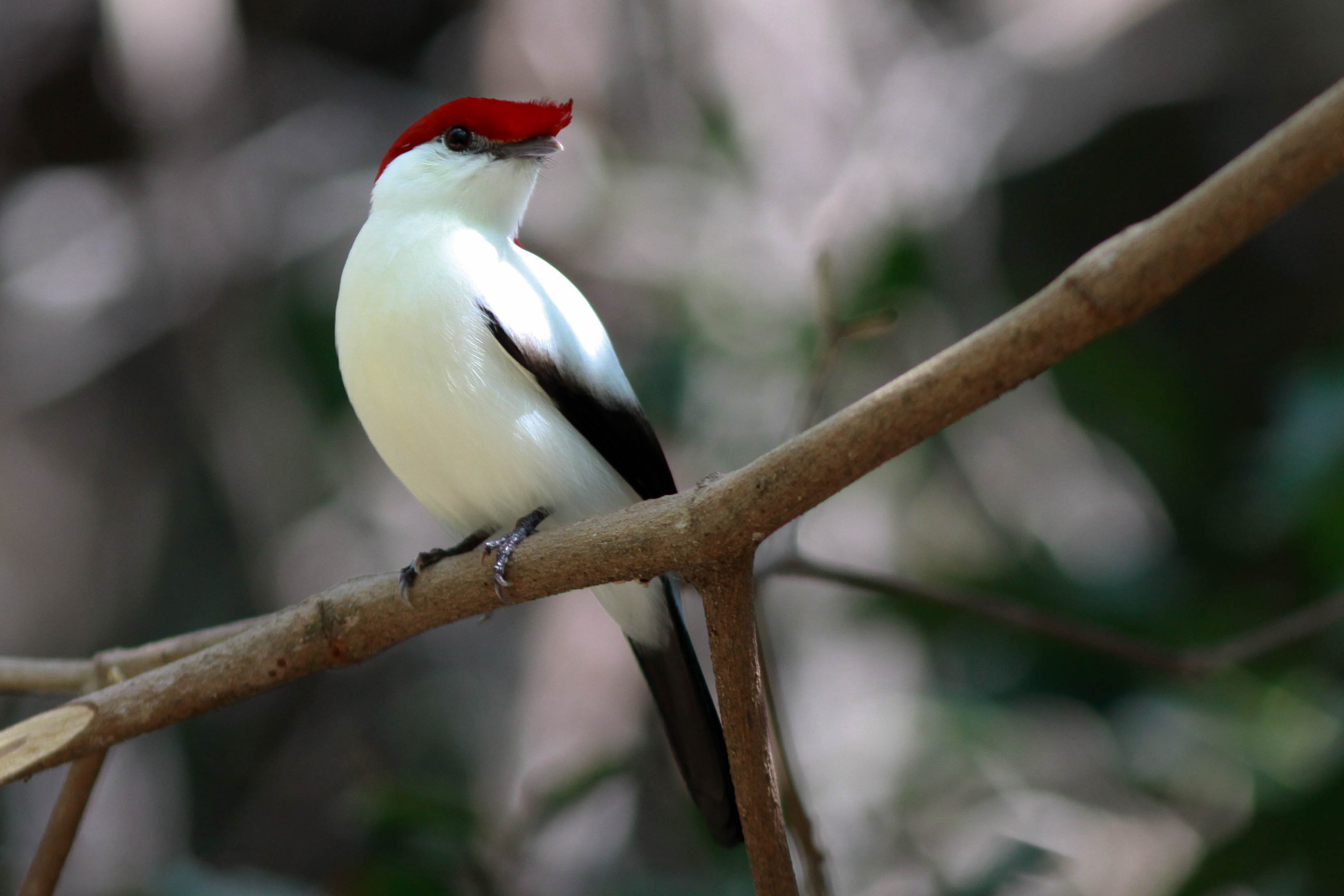
- Male
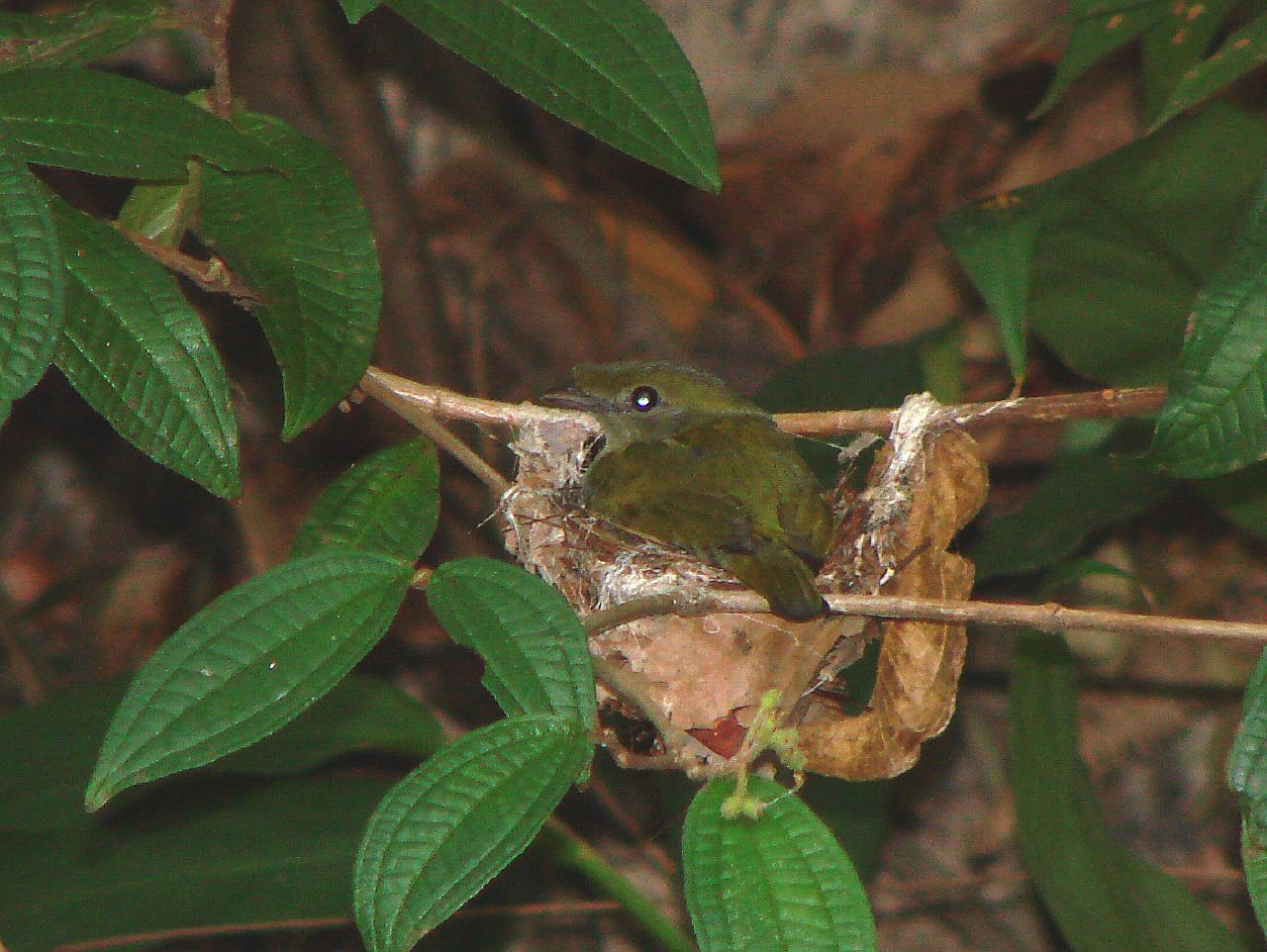
- Female on nest

Conservation status
- Critically Endangered (IUCN 3.1)

Scientific classification
- Kingdom: Animalia
- Phylum: Chordata
- Class: Aves
- Order: Passeriformes
- Family: Pipridae
- Genus: Chiroxiphia
- Species: C. bokermanni

Binomial name
- Chiroxiphia bokermanni (Coelho & Silva, W, 1998)

= Araripe manakin =

Species of bird in Brazil

The Araripe manakin (Chiroxiphia bokermanni) is a species of bird from the family of manakins (Pipridae). It was discovered in 1996 and scientifically described in 1998. The species epithet commemorates Brazilian zoologist and wildlife filmmaker Werner Bokermann, who died in 1995. Because of its helmet-like crown it has received the Portuguese name soldadinho-do-araripe which means "little soldier of Araripe". This name also associates it with the related, but more widespread, helmeted manakin (Chiroxiphia galeata), which is known simply as the soldadinho.

== Description ==
As typical of most manakins, males and females have a strong sexual dimorphism in the colours of the plumage. As in the helmeted manakin, it is a relatively large and long-tailed manakin, with a total length of c. 14.5 centimetres (5.7 in). The strikingly patterned males have predominantly white plumage. With the exception of the white little wings coverts, the wings are black as the tail. From the frontal tuft, over the crown, down to the middle back runs a carmine red patch. The iris is red. The females are mainly olive green and have pale green upperparts. They have a reduced olive green frontal tuft.

== Diet ==
This species consumes both plant and animal materials as part of their diet. Approximately 80% of their diet comes from the plant Clidemia biserrata. Araripe Manakins consume fruit and arthropods, although fruits are the primary item in their diet. Females have a more diverse diet than males, because the more cryptic olive-green plumage of females provides them with a greater degree of camouflage in forests, allowing them to find food with less predation, meanwhile, males are a very bright white color, which makes them more vulnerable to predation. Females also have a longer bill, which allows them to manipulate more types of fruit than males are able to handle and digest.

== Breeding ==
Females lay 1- or 2-egg clutches and may attempt renesting if the nest fails. The Araripe Manakin's nesting period corresponds to the rainy season of approximately 6 months, and its annual reproductive capacity is 2 fledglings.

== Distribution ==
This species is endemic to the Chapada do Araripe (Araripe uplands) in the Brazilian state of Ceará in the north eastern region of the country. It is only fifty kilometres long and one kilometre wide and the typical habitat apparently is a consequence of the soils formed from the Santana Formation limestone. The pure breeding range has a size of only 1 km^{2} (0.39 mi^{2}) and lies in a theme park. It is likely to be more widespread than presently known, although surveys in nearby Balneario das Caldas failed to locate any individuals.

== Threats ==
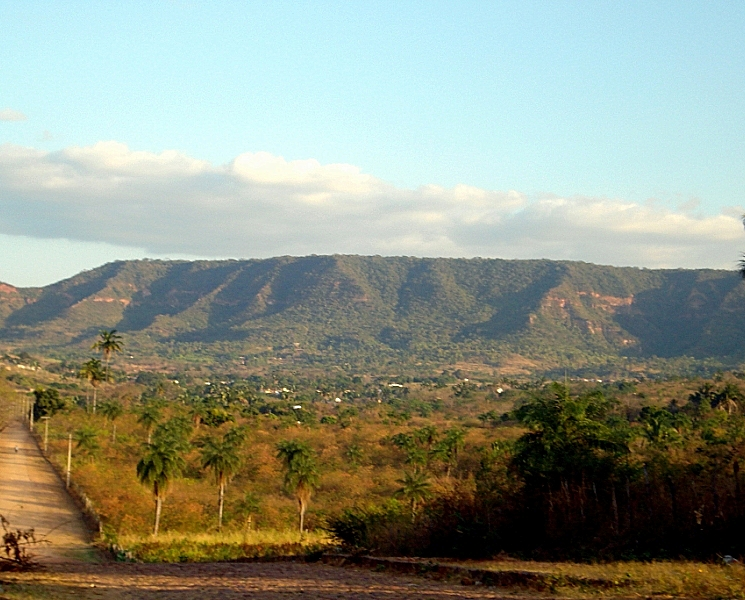
Chapada do Araripe is the only known locality

In 2000 there was an estimated population of less than 50 individuals and it was considered as one of the rarest birds in Brazil and in the world. Only three males and one female were found until that date. In 2003 the estimations were more optimistic and BirdLife International assumed the population of 49 to 250 individuals. In 2004 it proceeded on the assumption that an estimated 783 individuals exist in the wild which was based on 43 discovered males. In 2000 a theme park with swimming pools and asphalted roads was built at the type locality Nascente do Farias and the largest part of its original habitat was destroyed. The cleared trees were replaced by banana plantations. The last assessed population was on August 7, 2018. An estimated 150 - 700 mature individuals are living in Brazil.

At the BirdLife International celebrity lecture held in Peterborough on 16 August 2008, it was announced that Sir David Attenborough would be championing the Araripe manakin in an effort to raise funds to help protect this rare bird. There are approximately 500 pairs of the Araripe manakin left. Sir David was presented with a picture of the manakin following his lecture, which was on Alfred Russel Wallace and Birds of Paradise.
