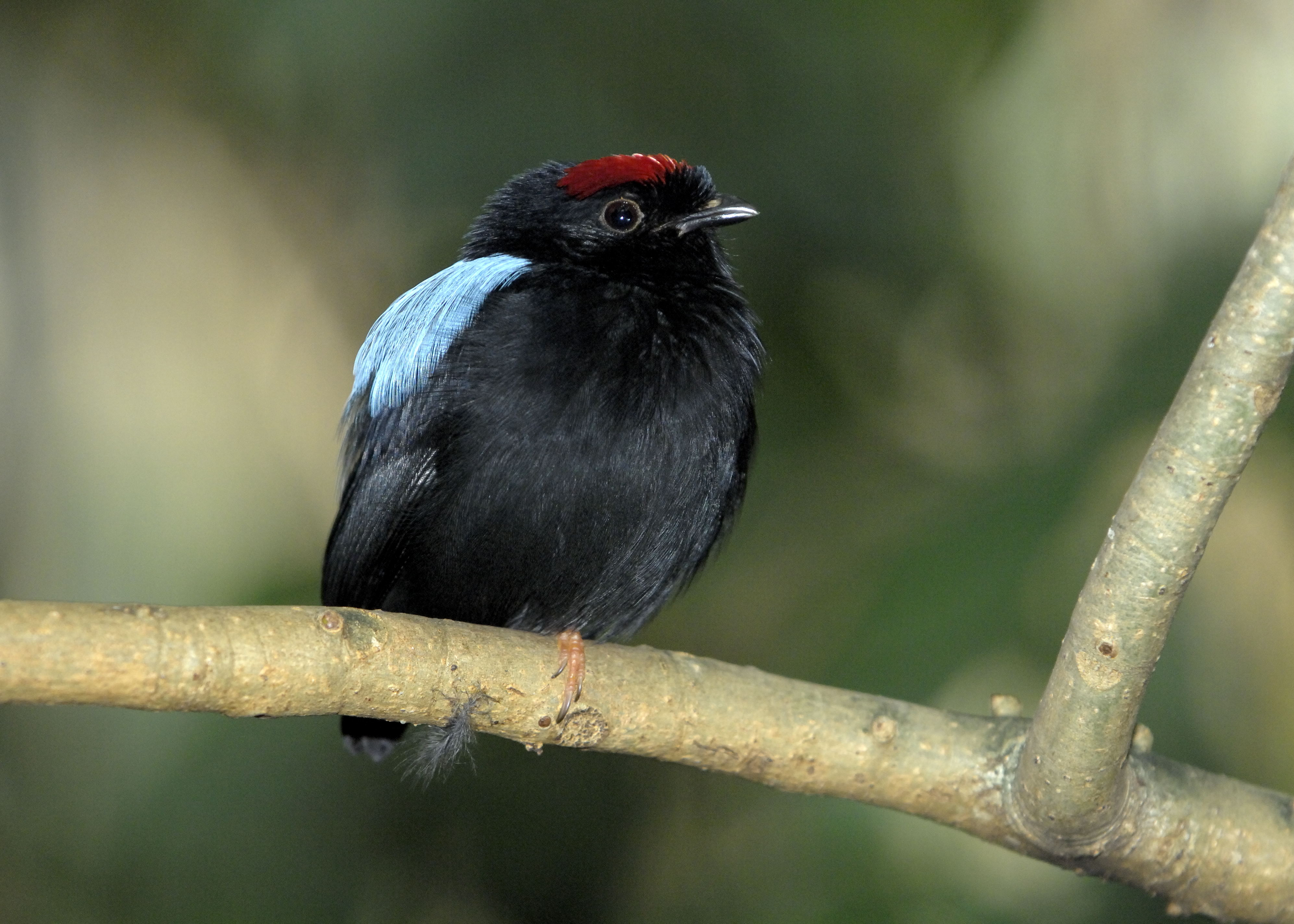
- Blue-backed manakin (Chiroxiphia pareola)

Scientific classification
- Kingdom: Animalia
- Phylum: Chordata
- Class: Aves
- Order: Passeriformes
- Family: Pipridae
- Genus: Chiroxiphia; Cabanis, 1847

Type species
- Pipra caudata Shaw, 1793

Species
- 7, see text

= Chiroxiphia =

Genus of birds

Chiroxiphia is one of several genera of manakins, small song birds of South and Central America.

== Taxonomy ==
The genus Chiroxiphia was introduced in 1847 by the German ornithologist Jean Cabanis. He listed five species in the new genus but did not specify the type. In 1855 the English zoologist George Gray designated the type as Pipra caudata Shaw, 1793, the blue manakin. The name Chiroxiphia combines Ancient Greek ειρ/kheir, χειρος/kheiros meaning "hand" with ξιφος/xiphos meaning "sword".

== Description ==
The male plumage is a striking combination of black and bright blue. The crown is red, except in the yellow-crowned C. pareola regina. Females are comparably dull olive-greenish overall. Juveniles of both sexes resemble the adult female. As the male plumage takes several years to complete, individuals showing a level of intermediacy between full adult male and female-like juveniles are commonly seen (in particular female-plumaged birds with red, or yellow in C. pareola regina, crowns).

== Breeding ==
Manakins of the genus Chiroxiphia have an unusual mating system, based on female mate choice. In order to mate successfully, males have to form partnerships with another male. The two males co-operate in an elaborate courtship dance, and sing a joint song (called a duet) at one of many traditionally fixed mating sites; the area where mating takes place can be described as an exploded lek. In some species such as the blue manakin, these partnerships typically consist of three males. Females attend a number of these courtship sites, observing the male displays and eventually allow a male at one of the sites to mate.

The males can typically be designated alpha and beta, since there is a clear dominance relationship between them. There is only ever one alpha male, but, depending on species, there may be one or two beta males. Beta males are sometimes sub-adults - easily recognized, as their plumage retain female-like characters. Only the alpha male is ever seen to mate with the female.

As in other manakins, males play no part in the care of the young.

The genus, Antilophia was introduced in 1850 by the German naturalist Ludwig Reichenbach to accommodate the helmeted manakin. Until the discovery of the Araripe manakin, the helmeted manakin was the only member of the genus Antilophia. When multiple genetic studies found that Antilophia was embedded within Chiroxiphia, the two species of Antilophia were merged into Chiroxiphia. They are the only two species of manakin with dichromatic (two-coloured) male plumage.

== Species ==
The genus contains the following seven species:

Image	Scientific name	Common name	Distribution
	Chiroxiphia galeata	Helmeted manakin	Brazil; also northeast Paraguay, and a border region of northeast Bolivia
	Chiroxiphia bokermanni	Araripe manakin	Brazil
	Chiroxiphia lanceolata	Lance-tailed manakin	from Costa Rica to northern Venezuela.
	Chiroxiphia linearis	Long-tailed manakin	Costa Rica, El Salvador, Guatemala, Honduras, Mexico, and Nicaragua
	Chiroxiphia pareola	Blue-backed manakin	southern Colombia, eastern Venezuela, the Guyanas, northeast Brazil, the Amazon Basin in Brazil, Bolivia, Ecuador and Peru; and in Tobago.
	Chiroxiphia boliviana	Yungas manakin	Yungas of southeastern Peru and Bolivia.
	Chiroxiphia caudata	Blue manakin	south-eastern Brazil, eastern Paraguay and far north-eastern Argentina.
