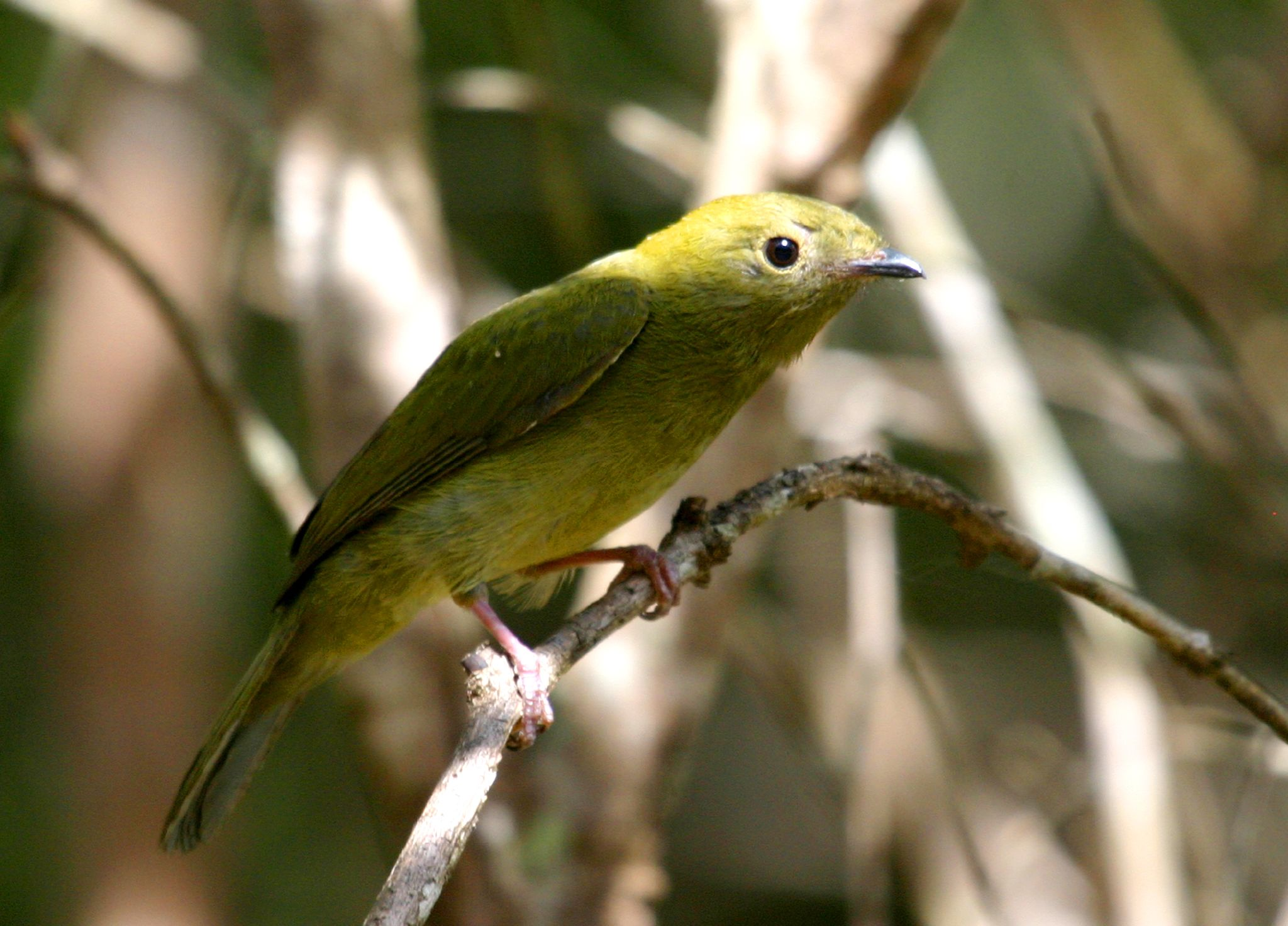
- Female
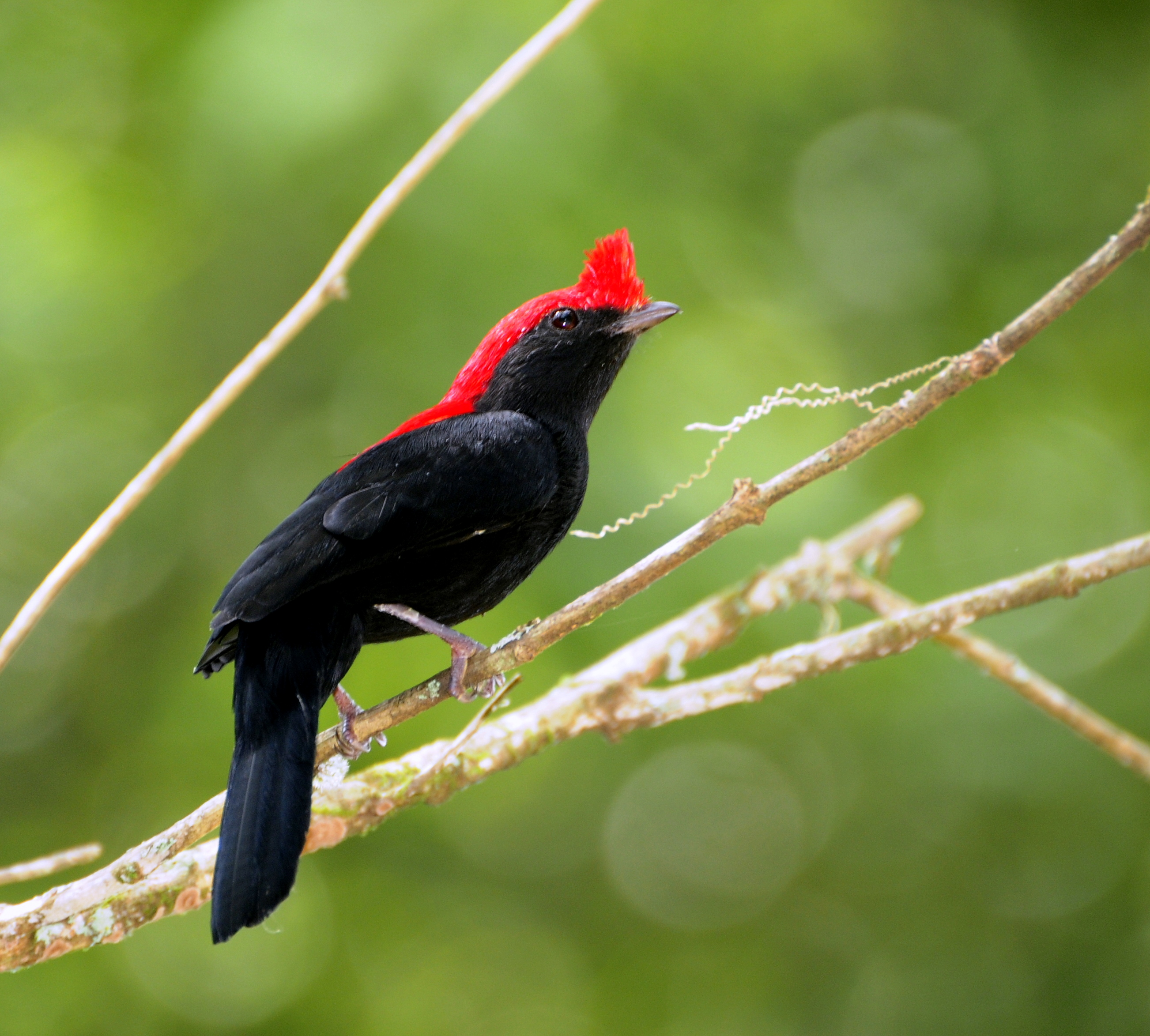
- Male

Conservation status
- Least Concern (IUCN 3.1)

Scientific classification
- Kingdom: Animalia
- Phylum: Chordata
- Class: Aves
- Order: Passeriformes
- Family: Pipridae
- Genus: Chiroxiphia
- Species: C. galeata

Binomial name
- Chiroxiphia galeata (Lichtenstein, MHC, 1823)

= Helmeted manakin =

Species of bird

The helmeted manakin (Chiroxiphia galeata) is a species of small passerine bird in the manakin family Pipridae. Unlike most manakins, a family associated with tropical rainforests, the helmeted manakin inhabits the seasonally dry Cerrado savanna of Central Brazil.

== Taxonomy ==
The helmeted manakin was formally described in 1823 by the German naturalist Hinrich Lichtenstein from specimens collected near São Paulo in Brazil. He coined the binomial name Pipra galeata.

The helmeted manakin was placed together with the critically endangered Araripe manakin in the genus Antilophia that was introduced by Ludwig Reichenbach in 1850. Antilophia were considered very closely related to Chiroxiphia, another genus of manakin which inhabit rainforests in Central and South America, and there is possible hybridization between them. Therefore, the two species were transferred to the genus Chiroxiphia. The helmeted manakin is monotypic: no subspecies are recognised.

== Description ==
The helmeted manakin has sexually dimorphic plumage. Both males and females are adorned with a feathered crest at the crown of the head. Females and immature males sport a uniform dull-green plumage similar to other female Pipridae. Males are a glossy black with a striking red crest that stretches across the mantle, nape and crown. Subadult males have green plumage with the characteristic black and red colors of the adult male sprouting up in patches.

The helmeted manakin has a sonorous song that has been likened to that of a cotinga. The male song is a whistle composed of eight notes. The song is loud enough to be perceived by the human ear up to 100m away in the forest. Males sing year-round, but song-intensity is highest from July to November.

== Distribution and habitat ==
Helmeted manakins are endemic to the Cerrado savanna ecosystems of central Brazil as well as pockets in northeast Paraguay and Bolivia. They are often found near bodies of water in gallery forests. The seasonally dry Cerrado is an unusual habitat for Pipridae, a family that typically occupies lush rainforests. Within its atypical habitat the Helmeted manakin is fairly abundant. Although its populations are on the decline, due to its large distribution the Helmeted manakin is considered of least concern by the IUNC.

== Behaviour ==
=== Diet ===
Like most Pipridae the helmeted manakin is primarily a frugivorous species, though populations in gallery forests near Capetinga, Brazil have been documented gleaning and sallying insects. Helmeted manakins have been observed participating in mixed-species flocks with other passerine birds. Fruit availability in the Cerrado savanna ecosystems is highly seasonal; fruiting peaks in the wet season, and diminishes by 80% in the dry season. Accordingly, the foraging habits of helmeted manakins vary seasonally. In the wet season they forage primarily in the canopy and are selective in their choice of fruit, preferentially foraging for the highest quality fruit. In the dry season they forage in the understory and are less choosy about the fruit species that they consume. Helmeted manakins are important seed dispersers for a number of fruiting plants in the Cerrado.

=== Breeding ===
The reproductive period for males stretches from July to December, with a peak in singing intensity and courtship displays in August and September. Female reproductive period begins in August and ends in December. Like many Pipridae, males and females are non-monogamous and can have multiple mates. During the breeding season males frequent multiple leks to perform for different females. Mixed-paternity has been documented in chicks from the same nest, indicating females may choose multiple mates.

In the wet season males establish feeding territories and defend them from other males. In the dry season, when food is less abundant, territorial boundaries dissipate and home range overlap between individuals increases. Subadult males occasionally sing and engage in territorial behaviour. Home ranges of males and females are large (on average 16 to 20 hectares during the breeding season) and overlap considerably with one another.

Like all members of Pipridae male helmeted manakins gather in leks during the mating season where they perform a courtship display for an onlooking female. The female helmeted manakin initiates the courtship display with short call. Up to six prospective males gather in a single lek in the forest canopy. The helmeted manakin's mating display is unusually subdued for a Pipridae, a family characterized by their complex and flashy courtship performances. The male birds initiate a series of chase-flights, during which they disappear into the canopy in mutual pursuit. After completing a circuit the males return to the lek before repeating the chase-flight performance again. Subadult males have been observed participating in courtship displays.

Nests are bowl-shaped and assembled from twigs and roots. The outside of the nest is decorated with dry leaves while the inside is lined with shitaki fungus. Nests are typically constructed up to 3m off the ground in shrubs or other vegetation. Nests are usually secured within a forked branch and are attached using spider silk. Clutches always consist of two eggs, which are yellowish-white in colour with irregular spots, blotches or streaks. Males contribute no parental care; females are solely responsible for constructing and cleaning the nest.
