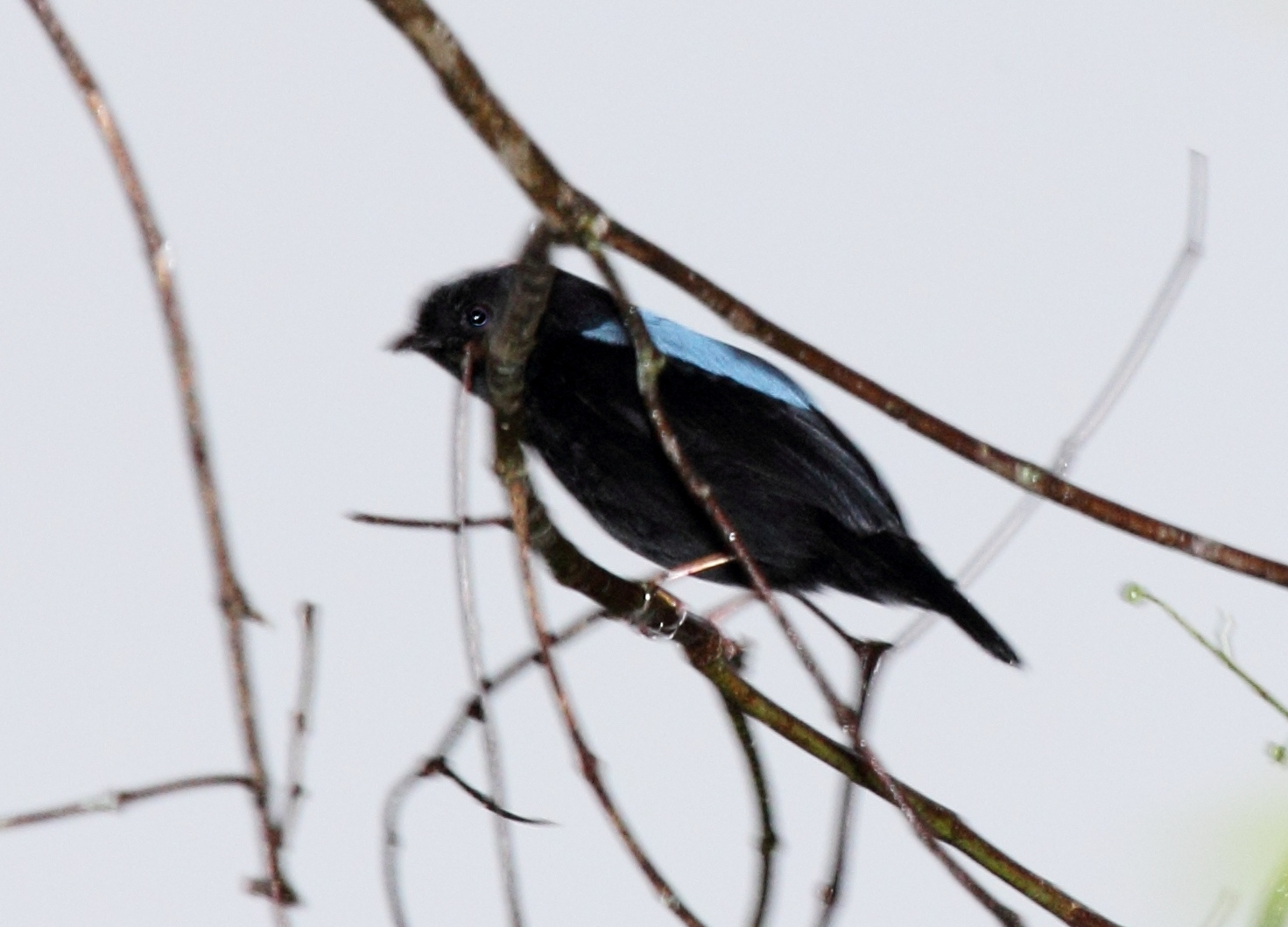

Conservation status
- Least Concern (IUCN 3.1)

Scientific classification
- Kingdom: Animalia
- Phylum: Chordata
- Class: Aves
- Order: Passeriformes
- Family: Pipridae
- Genus: Chiroxiphia
- Species: C. boliviana

Binomial name
- Chiroxiphia boliviana Allen, 1889

= Yungas manakin =

Species of bird

The Yungas manakin (Chiroxiphia boliviana) is a species of bird in the family Pipridae. It is found in Argentina, Bolivia, and Peru.

== Taxonomy and systematics ==
The Yungas manakin was originally described in 1889 as Chiroxiphia pareola boliviana, a subspecies of the blue-backed manakin. A study published in 1987 noted how it differed in morphology, song, and courtship display from C. pareola sensu stricto. Following the study's suggestions, taxonomic systems elevated it to species rank with its current English name.

The Yungas manakin is monotypic.

== Description ==
The Yungas manakin is 12 to 13 cm (4.7 to 5.1 in) long and weighs about 14 to 22 g (0.49 to 0.78 oz). The species is sexually dimorphic, though both sexes have a short tuft of feathers on the forecrown. Adult males have a small dark red patch in the center of their crown and a pale blue back. The rest of their plumage is black. Adult females have olive-green upperparts with browner wing coverts and flight feathers. Their underparts are a paler green that becomes paler still on the lower belly and undertail coverts. Both sexes have a brown, gray-brown, or reddish brown iris, a black or blackish bill, and highly variable purplish brown to pale yellowish cream legs and feet.

== Distribution and habitat ==
The Yungas manakin is found along the eastern slope of the Andes from Cuzco Department in southern Peru south through Bolivia into far northern Argentina. There are also a few records further north in Peru's San Martín Department. The species' range extension into Argentina appears to be relatively recent. The IOC and Clements taxonomy ranges do not include Argentina but the independent South American Classification Committee has records in that country.

The Yungas manakin is true to its name; its range is entirely within the Yungas biome. It inhabits humid montane forest, where it apparently favors the edges with fruiting trees. In elevation it ranges between 900 and 2,000 m (3,000 and 6,600 ft) in Peru and between 400 and 2,600 m (1,300 and 8,500 ft) in Bolivia. One individual apparently wandered up to 3,200 m (10,500 ft).

== Behavior ==
=== Movement ===
The Yungas manakin is a year-round resident.

=== Feeding ===
The Yungas manakin feeds on fruit, though details are lacking. In one study it favored fruits of Ficus figs and Melastomataceae. It usually forages singly.

=== Breeding ===
The Yungas manakin's breeding season has not been defined but includes August to November and perhaps July. Males display to females, both singly and in leks, but the display has not been formally described. Nothing else is known about the species' breeding biology.

=== Vocalization ===
The Yungas manakin's song is "a loud "CHEW'LEW!", "CHEW!", "TCHAW", or "WHEW!" and is often sung in chorus. The male's display call is "a quiet, nasal, buzzy errwahh repeated several times". Another call is "a rising, ani-like huLEE?".

== Status ==
The IUCN has assessed the Yungas manakin as being of Least Concern. It has a large range; its population size is not known and is believed to be decreasing. No immediate threats have been identified. The species is considered fairly common, and "[h]uman activity has little short-term direct effect on Yungas Manakin, other than the local effects of habitat destruction".
