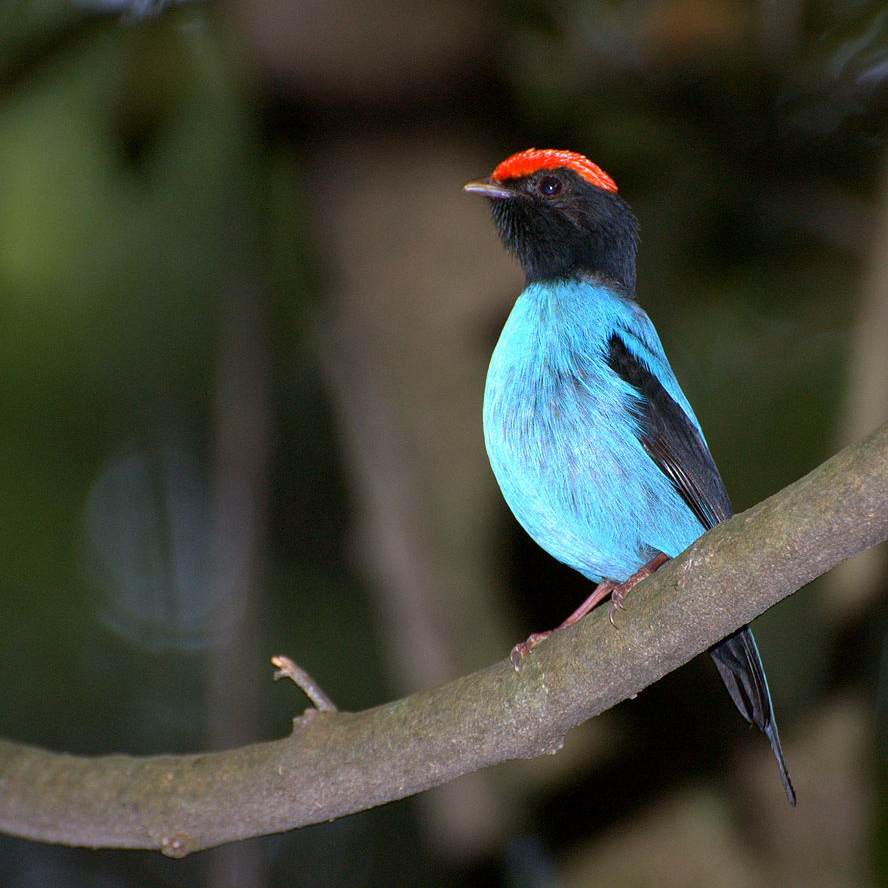
- Male
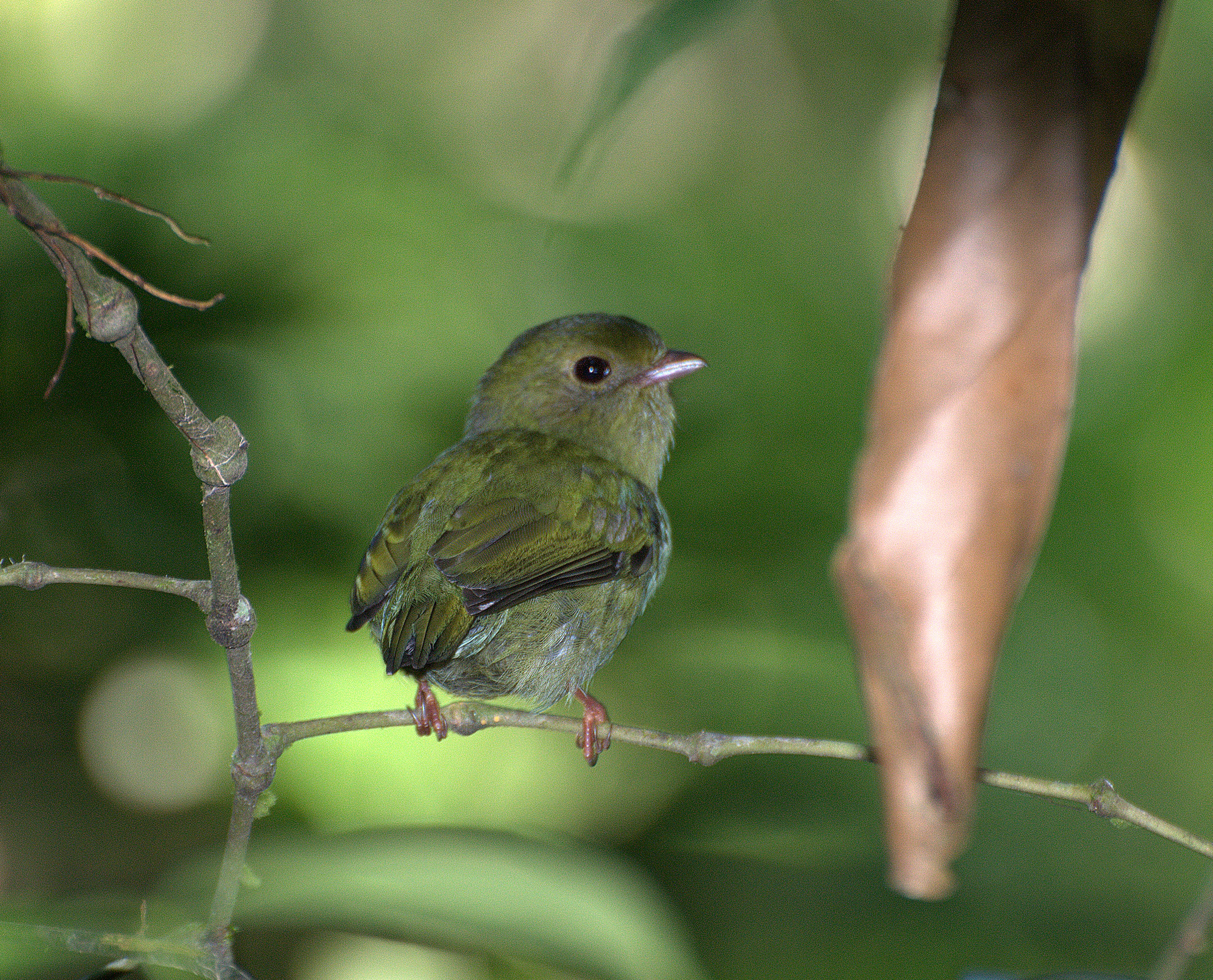
- Female

Conservation status
- Least Concern (IUCN 3.1)

Scientific classification
- Kingdom: Animalia
- Phylum: Chordata
- Class: Aves
- Order: Passeriformes
- Family: Pipridae
- Genus: Chiroxiphia
- Species: C. caudata

Binomial name
- Chiroxiphia caudata (Shaw, 1793)

Synonyms
- Pipra caudata (basionym, Shaw & Nodder, 1793)

= Blue manakin =

Species of bird

The blue manakin or swallow-tailed manakin (Chiroxiphia caudata) is a small species of bird in the family Pipridae. It is found mainly in the Atlantic Forest of south-eastern Brazil, eastern Paraguay and far north-eastern Argentina. Its typical habitat is wet lowland or montane forest and heavily degraded former forest. Males have a bright blue body, black head wings and tail and a red crown. Females and juveniles are olive-green. At breeding time, males are involved in lekking behaviour when they sing and dance to impress females. This is a common species with a wide range, and the International Union for Conservation of Nature has rated its conservation status as being of "least concern".

== Distribution and habitat ==
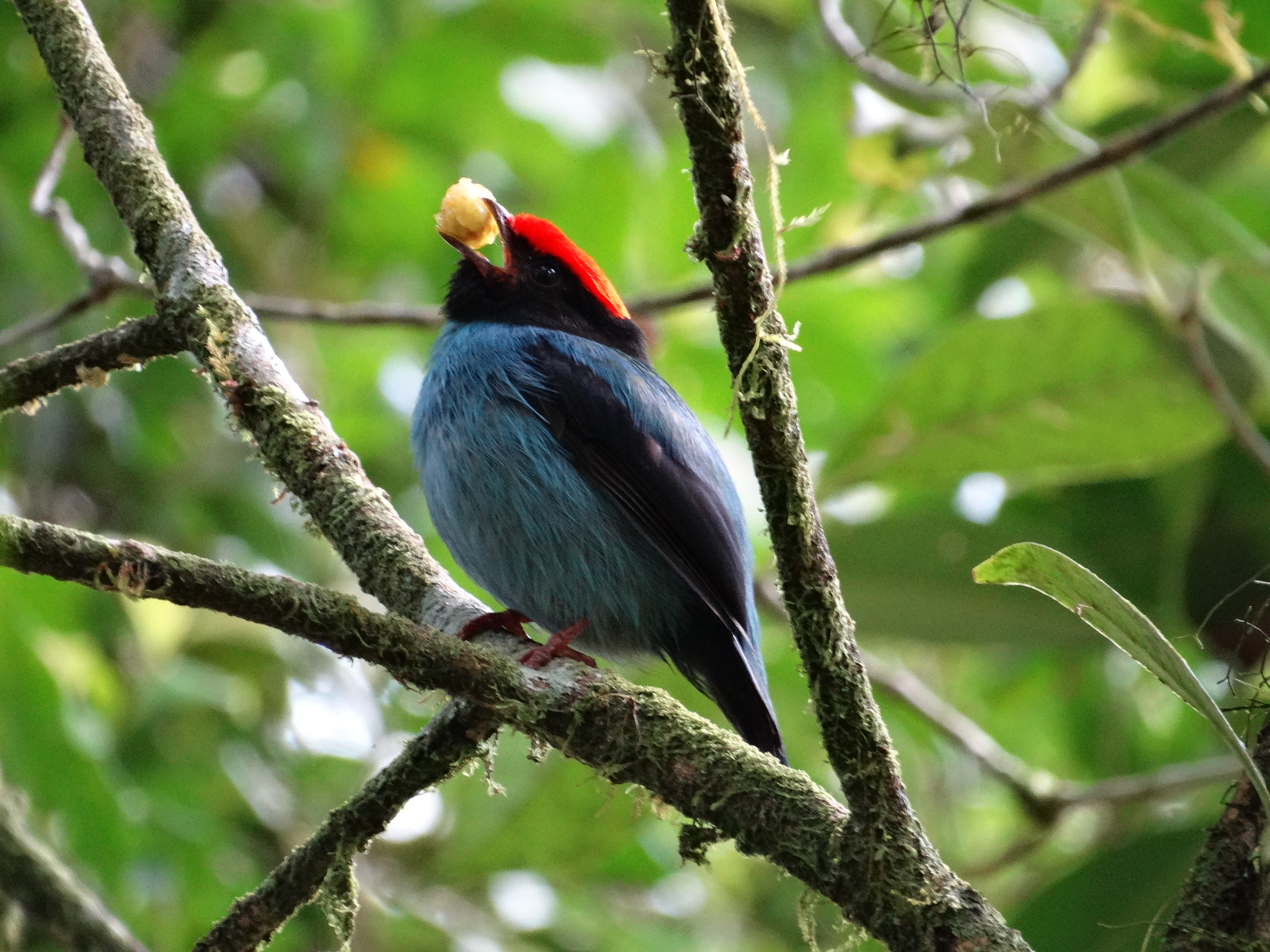
Blue manakin feeding

This bird is found in north-eastern Argentina, southern and south-eastern Brazil, and Paraguay. Its natural habitats are subtropical or tropical moist lowland forest, subtropical or tropical moist montane forest, and heavily degraded former forest. It is generally common in the appropriate habitats within its range.

One to five males live within an area of 100 m^{2}, consisting of one alpha male, one beta male, and a few gamma males. Each area has four to six display perches which are horizontal vines, branches, or lianas one meter off the ground. The main display arena is cleaned by the alpha and beta males by removing moss, leaves, or twigs from the perch, making it appear whiter.

== Description ==
Lekking display from Ilhabela, Brazil

At a length of around 15 cm (5.9 in) and a weight of around 25.6 g (0.90 oz), this small sparrow-sized bird may be the largest species within the diminutive manakin family. Formerly, the name "swallow-tailed manakin" was used widely, but as it is misleading (the tail is unlike that of any swallow), this name has largely been abandoned for "superior blue manakin". As suggested by this common name, the male is – by far – the manakin with most blue to the plumage. The entire body is bright blue, while the wings, tail and head, except for the red cap, are black. The far duller female is greenish-brown overall. Both sexes have elongated central rectrices.

Juvenile males resemble the adult female, but gradually develop first the red crown, then the black face-sides, and finally the remaining plumage of the adult male. The males form leks, typically consisting of a single adult and two sub-adult males, where they sing and "dance" to attract females. This was shown in the BBC's The Life of Birds documentary series. Due to the pronounced hypergamous nature of its females, up to 90% of male blue manakins never mate.

== Status ==
This bird has a very wide range, is common and is presumed to have a large total population. The population trend is thought to be stable and the International Union for Conservation of Nature has rated the bird's conservation status as being of "least concern".
