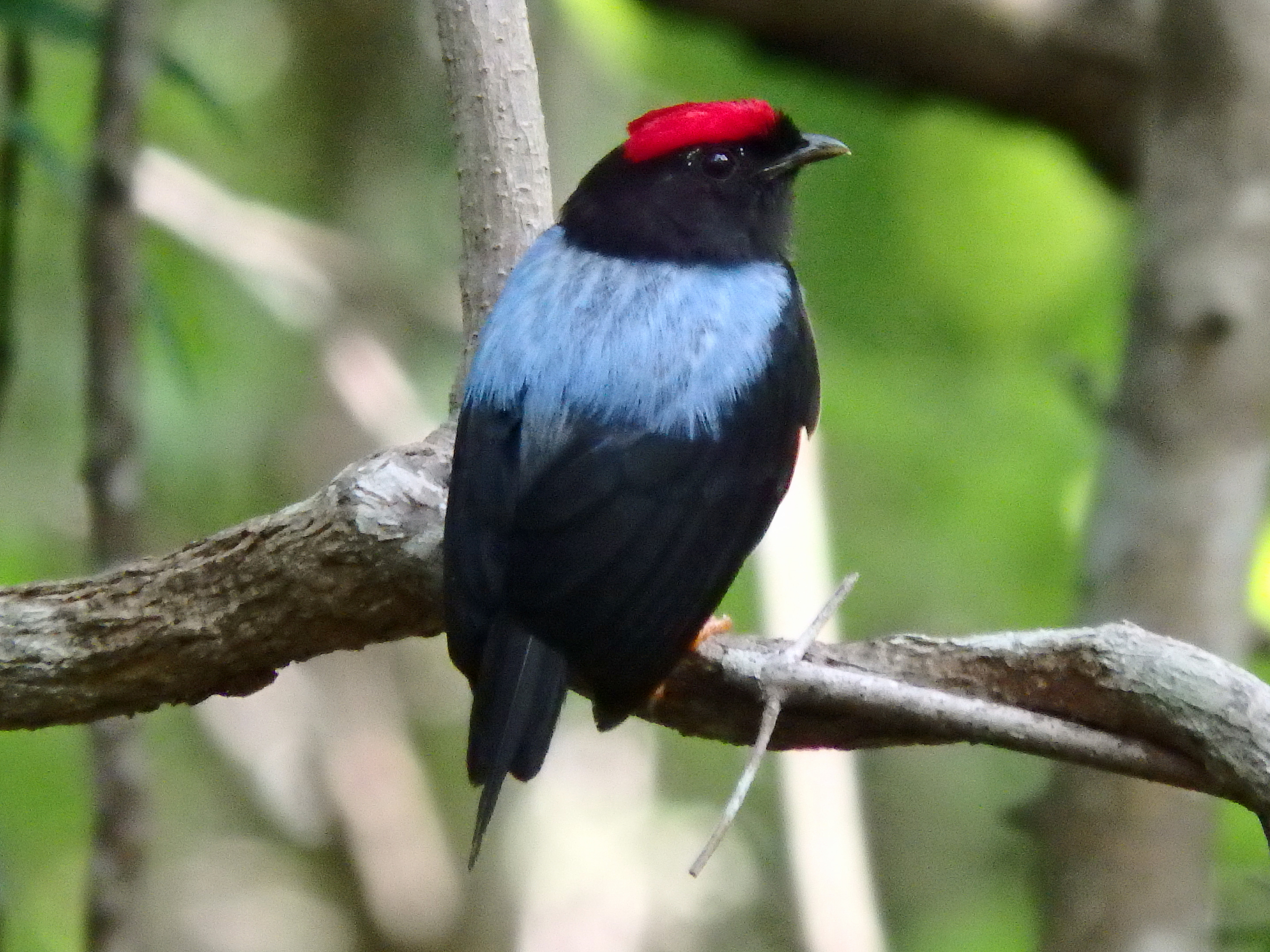

Conservation status
- Least Concern (IUCN 3.1)

Scientific classification
- Kingdom: Animalia
- Phylum: Chordata
- Class: Aves
- Order: Passeriformes
- Family: Pipridae
- Genus: Chiroxiphia
- Species: C. lanceolata

Binomial name
- Chiroxiphia lanceolata (Wagler, 1830)

= Lance-tailed manakin =

Species of bird

The lance-tailed manakin (Chiroxiphia lanceolata) is a small passerine bird which breeds in tropical Central and South America from Costa Rica to northern Venezuela. This manakin is a fairly common bird of dry and moist deciduous forests, but not rainforest. It is a small, compact bird about 13 centimetres (5 in) long and similar to the blue-backed manakin, but both sexes have the two central tail feathers elongated to form a spike. Males have black plumage with a blue back, a red crown and orange legs. Females and juveniles are olive-green with paler underparts. At breeding time, males are involved in a cooperative behaviour during which they jump up and down alternately. This is a fairly common species with a wide range, and the International Union for Conservation of Nature has rated its conservation status as being of "least concern".

== Description ==
Like other manakins, the lance-tailed manakin is a compact, brightly coloured forest bird, typically 13.5 cm long and weighing 17.5 g. Both sexes have bring orange legs and two central tail feathers elongated to form a spike.

Females are olive-green, with slightly paler underparts. Most females are solid green, however, a small portion have tawny or red caps. Adult males are mostly black, with a red cap and sky-blue back. Young males are olive but show a red cap and the start of a blue back as they mature. Male lance-tailed manakins do not reach their full adult plumage until approximately 26 months after hatching.

This species is similar to blue-backed manakin, Chiroxiphia pareola, which breeds further south and east, but the latter lacks the spiky tail, and the male has a somewhat darker blue back.

== Ecology ==
The male lance-tailed manakin has an interesting breeding display, unusual in that it is cooperative rather than competitive. Two males perch next to each other on a bare stick and jump up and down alternately, sometimes giving short flights. Groups of birds may perform together, with a different stick for each pair of displaying males. The female builds a cup nest in a tree; two brown-mottled cream eggs are laid, and incubated entirely by the female for about 20 days.

The lance-tailed manakin has a number of calls, including a Toe-LEE-do, a curry-ho, and a frog-like buzzing croak given by displaying males.

These manakins eat fruit and some insects.

== Status ==
This bird has a very wide range, is fairly common and is presumed to have a large total population. The population trend is thought to be stable and the International Union for Conservation of Nature has rated the bird's conservation status as being of "least concern".
