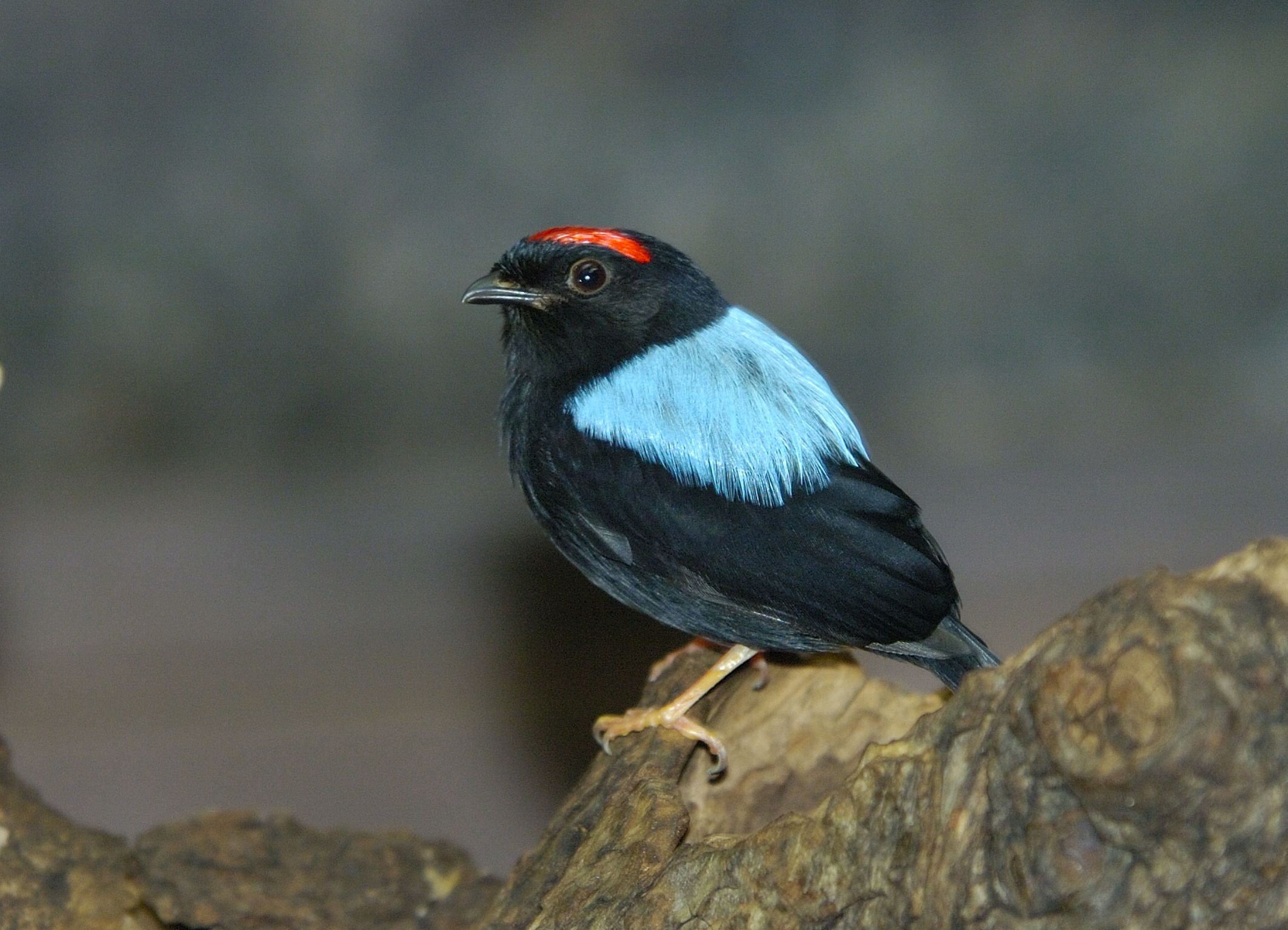
- Male

Conservation status
- Least Concern (IUCN 3.1)

Scientific classification
- Kingdom: Animalia
- Phylum: Chordata
- Class: Aves
- Order: Passeriformes
- Family: Pipridae
- Genus: Chiroxiphia
- Species: C. pareola

Binomial name
- Chiroxiphia pareola (Linnaeus, 1766)

Synonyms
- Pipra pareola Linnaeus, 1766

Audio
- Call recorded in Ecuador

= Blue-backed manakin =

Species of bird

The blue-backed manakin (Chiroxiphia pareola) is a small passerine bird which breeds in tropical South America, its range extending from Colombia and Tobago to southeastern Brazil. It is found in deciduous forests but not evergreen rainforests. It is a small, plump bird about 13 centimetres (5 in) long. Males have black plumage with a bright blue back and a red or yellow crown. Females and juveniles are olive-green with paler underparts. At breeding time, males are involved in a cooperative lekking behaviour during which they jump and twirl. This is a fairly common species with a wide range, and the International Union for Conservation of Nature has rated its conservation status as being of "least concern".

== Distribution and habitat ==
It is found in southern Colombia, eastern Venezuela, the Guyanas, northeast Brazil, the Amazon Basin in Brazil, Bolivia, Ecuador and Peru; and in Tobago. A disjunct population exists on the coastal strip of southeast Brazil, about 3000 km long. The blue-backed manakin is absent in the northwest Amazon Basin, a region from central Venezuela to the southern border of Colombia. This manakin is a fairly common bird of dry and moist deciduous forests, but not rainforest.

== Description ==
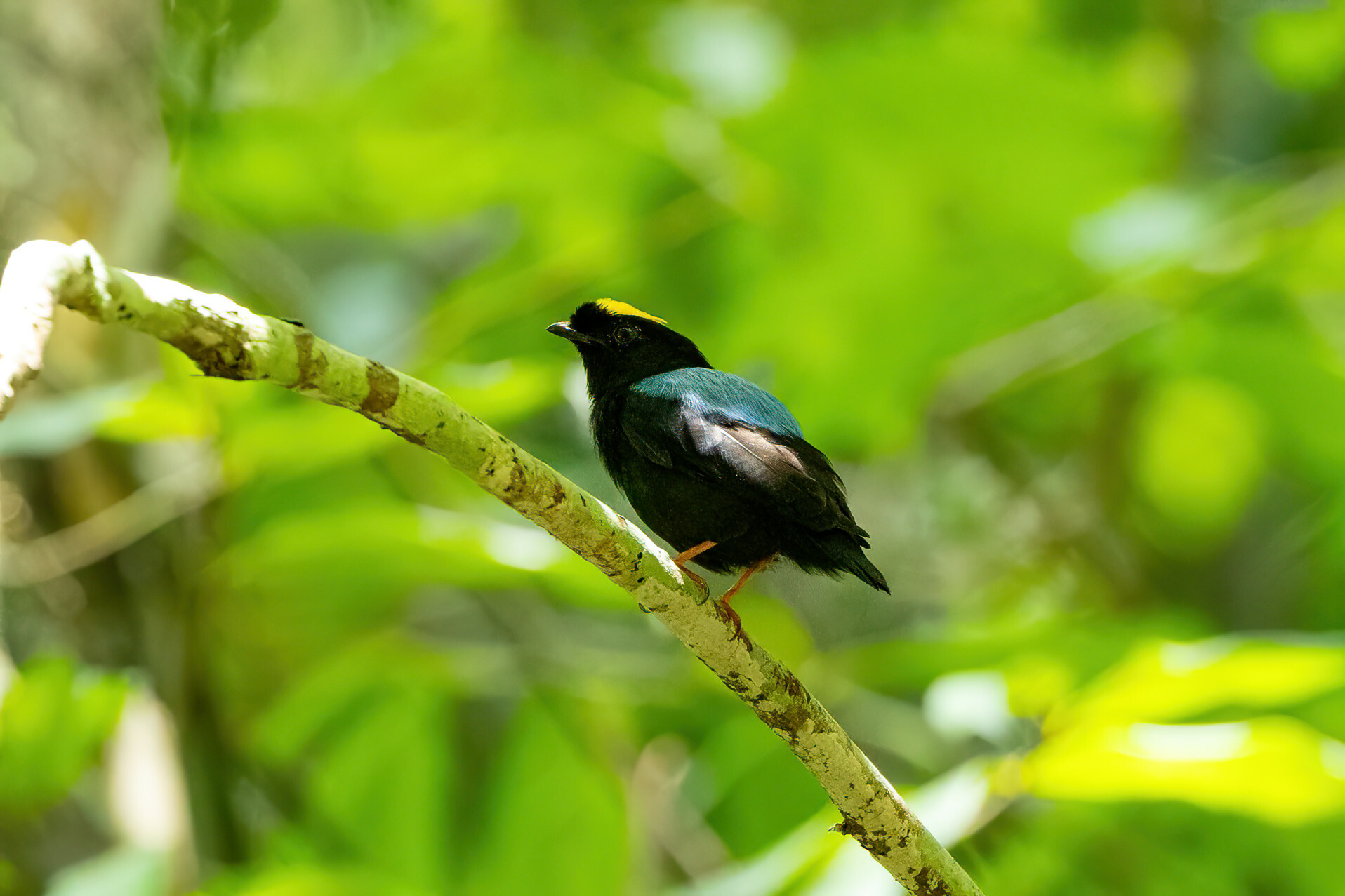
C. p. regina in Peru

Like other manakins, the blue-backed manakin is a compact, brightly coloured forest bird, typically 13 cm long and weighing 19 g. The male is mainly black with a bright blue back, and pale orange legs. The crown is typically red, but yellow in C. pareola regina from the south-west Amazon.

The female has olive-green upperparts, and somewhat paler olive underparts. Young males are olive, but show a red cap and the start of a blue back as they mature.

The race endemic to Tobago, C. p. atlantica is larger and has more extensive red on the crown and blue on the back. It has been suggested that it represents a separate species, the Tobago manakin, but no major authorities recognize this today.

This species is similar to lance-tailed manakin, Chiroxiphia lanceolata, which breeds further north from northern Venezuela to Costa Rica, but the latter has elongated central tail feathers, and the male has a somewhat brighter blue back.

== Ecology ==
The male blue-backed manakin has a fascinating breeding display, unusual in that it is a cooperative display rather than competitive. Two males perch next to each other on a bare stick and jump up and down alternately, giving a buzzing call. When a female approaches, the perched bird moves backwards under the jumping bird, so the two perform a vertical circling movement. Groups of up to eight birds may perform together, with a different stick for each pair of displaying males. The female builds a twig nest in a tree; two brown-mottled white eggs are laid, and incubated entirely by the female for about 20 days.

Apart from the buzzing display song, blue-backed manakin has a number of other calls, including a whee-whee-CHUP, sometimes given by two male in synchrony.

These manakins eat fruit and some insects.

== Status ==
This bird has a very wide range, is fairly common and is presumed to have a large total population. The population trend is thought to be stable and the International Union for Conservation of Nature has rated the bird's conservation status as being of "least concern".
