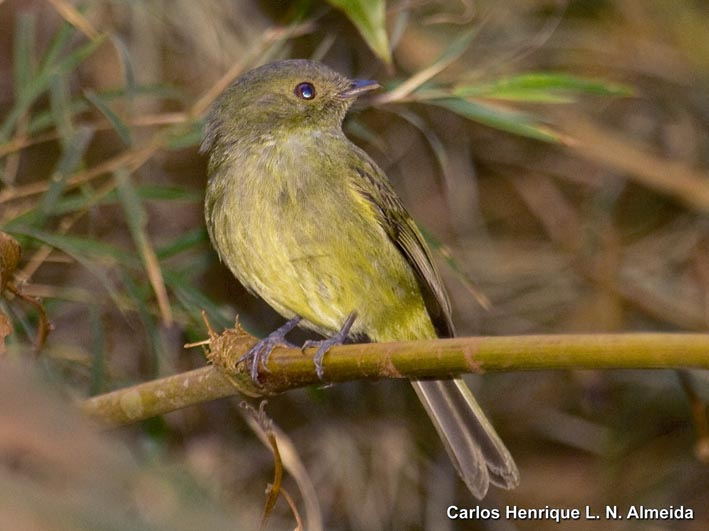
- At Campos do Jordão, São Paulo State, Brazil

Conservation status
- Least Concern (IUCN 3.1)

Scientific classification
- Kingdom: Animalia
- Phylum: Chordata
- Class: Aves
- Order: Passeriformes
- Family: Pipridae
- Genus: Protopelma van Els et al., 2023
- Species: P. chrysolophum

Binomial name
- Protopelma chrysolophum (Pinto, 1944)

= Serra do Mar tyrant-manakin =

Species of bird

The Serra do Mar tyrant-manakin (Protopelma chrysolophum), also known as the Serra do Mar neopelma and Serra tyrant-manakin, is a species of bird in the family Pipridae, the manakins. It is the only species in the genus Protopelma. It is endemic to Brazil.

== Taxonomy and systematics ==
The Serra do Mar tyrant-manakin was originally described in 1944 as a subspecies of Wied's tyrant-manakin (Neopelma aurifrons). They were separated based on a study published in 1995.

Previously, this species was classified under the genus Neopelma in classification systems worldwide. However, a large-scale analysis of suboscine passerines conducted in 2020 revealed that Neopelma is paraphyletic due to this species. To resolve paraphyly, the monotypic genus Protopelma was described in 2023, as this species represents a distinct lineage that diverged from other Neopelma and Tyranneutes species more than 10 million years ago. The genus was subsequently adopted by most authorities.

The Serra do Mar tyrant-manakin is monotypic.

== Description ==
The Serra do Mar tyrant-manakin is 13 to 13.5 cm (5.1 to 5.3 in) long and weighs 13.5 to 14.9 g (0.48 to 0.53 oz). The sexes have the same plumage. Adults have a conspicuous yellow patch in the middle of the crown. The rest of their face, their upperparts, wings, and tail are olive-green. Their throat is dull grayish white, their upper breast grayish olive, and their lower breast and belly pale sulphur-yellow. They have a pale grayish mauve iris, a grayish bill, and grayish legs and feet.

== Distribution and habitat ==
The Serra do Mar tyrant-manakin is found in coastal southeastern Brazil from east-central Minas Gerais and Rio de Janeiro state south at least to far southern São Paulo state and possibly beyond into Paraná. It inhabits the Serra do Mar coastal forests, where it greatly favors the forest edge, dense secondary forest, and areas of stunted woody vegetation. It shuns the forest interior. In elevation it ranges between 1,150 and 1,800 m (3,800 and 5,900 ft).

== Behavior ==
=== Movement ===
The Serra do Mar tyrant-manakin is believed to be a year-round resident.

=== Feeding ===
The Serra do Mar tyrant-manakin feeds mostly on small fruits and also includes insects in its diet. It plucks or grabs its food from vegetation with a short sally from a perch; sometimes it briefly hovers.

=== Breeding ===
Serra do Mar tyrant-manakin males sing from a horizontal perch. Nothing else is known about the species' breeding biology.

=== Vocalization ===
The Serra do Mar tyrant-manakin's song is a "series of random, well-separated notes, such as a slow, staccato rih-tjew-tjew-tjuh, rrítju (rr stressed), tjuwtju, or vrrrrrú".

== Status ==
The IUCN has assessed the Serra do Mar tyrant-manakin as being of Least Concern. It has a limited range; its population size is not known and is believed to be decreasing. No immediate threats have been identified. It is considered common. "Much suitable habitat persists in protected areas within its rather limited range."
