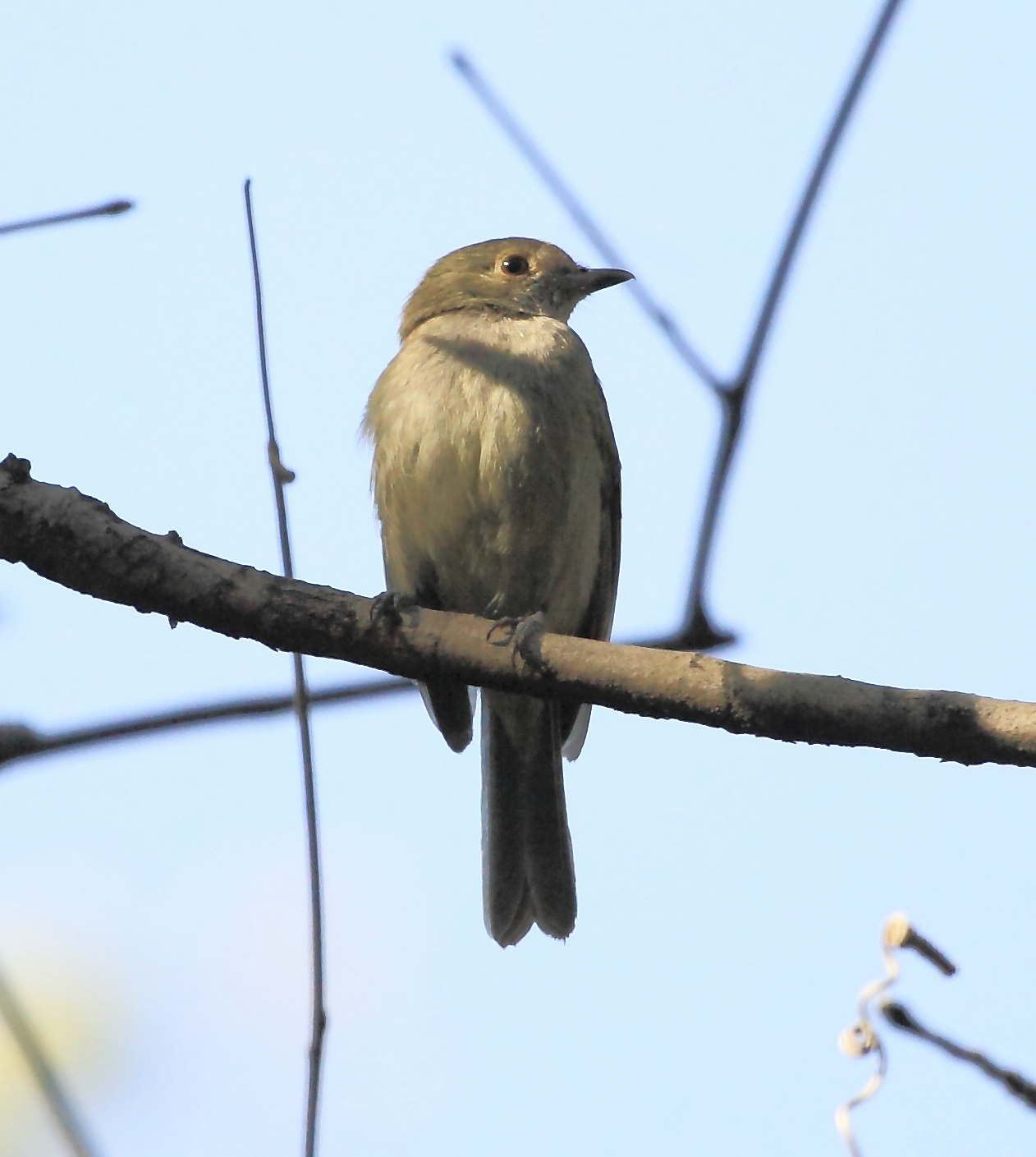

Conservation status
- Least Concern (IUCN 3.1)

Scientific classification
- Kingdom: Animalia
- Phylum: Chordata
- Class: Aves
- Order: Passeriformes
- Family: Pipridae
- Genus: Neopelma
- Species: N. pallescens

Binomial name
- Neopelma pallescens (Lafresnaye, 1853)

= Pale-bellied tyrant-manakin =

Species of bird

The pale-bellied tyrant-manakin (Neopelma pallescens) is a species of bird in the family Pipridae, the manakins. It is found in Brazil, Guyana, and possibly Bolivia.

== Taxonomy and systematics ==
The sulphur-bellied tyrant-manakin was originally described in 1853 as Tyrannula pallescens, mistakenly placing it in the New World flycatcher family. It was later reassigned to genus Neopelma that was erected in 1860.

The pale-bellied tyrant-manakin is monotypic.

== Description ==
The pale-bellied tyrant-manakin is about 14 cm (5.5 in) long and weighs 16 to 20.5 g (0.56 to 0.72 oz). The sexes have the same plumage. Adults have a large bright yellow patch with dusky borders on the crown. The rest of their face, their upperparts, and their wings and tail are olive. Their throat is whitish with faint gray streaks, their breast pale olivaceous gray, and their belly pale creamy whitish. They have a grayish mauve iris, a brownish to grayish bill, and brownish to grayish legs and feet.

== Distribution and habitat ==
The pale-bellied tyrant-manakin has a disjunct distribution. Its largest range is in Brazil from the Atlantic in Maranhão and southwest almost to Bolivia in Mato Grosso, then sweeping east to northern Minas Gerais and then northeast to the Atlantic in northern Bahia and Rio Grande do Norte. (Some sources show the population in the far northeast separately from the rest of the Brazilian range.) A small range is along the lower Amazon and Tapajós rivers in eastern Pará and Amapá. There are also confirmed reports in southern Guyana. One source places it in Suriname but the South American Classification Committee (SACC) has no records in that country. Some sources place it in extreme northeastern Bolivia but the SACC has only unconfirmed records there.

The pale-bellied tyrant-manakin inhabits deciduous and gallery woodlands, where it favors areas with heavy growth of vines. In elevation it reaches 700 m (2,300 ft).

== Behavior ==
=== Movement ===
The pale-bellied tyrant-manakin is believed to be a year-round resident.

=== Feeding ===
The pale-bellied tyrant-manakin's diet and foraging behavior have not been studied but it is believed to feed mostly on insects and some fruit as well.

=== Breeding ===
The pale-bellied tyrant-manakin's breeding season is not known but appears to include November in eastern Brazil. Individual males display to females by leaping up from a branch and landing facing the other way. Nothing else is known about the species' breeding biology.

=== Vocalization ===
The pale-bellied tyrant-manakin's song is a "series of 1 long and 2 short hoarse, froglike, wreh-wrawra notes". Its call is a "hurried rutrut---"; the rut is upslurred and repeated up to seven times.

== Status ==
The IUCN has assessed the pale-bellied tyrant-manakin as being of Least Concern. It has a very large range; its population size is not known and is believed to be decreasing. No immediate threats have been identified. It is considered "uncommon to frequent" in Brazil. It occurs in at least one protected area in Brazil and apparently one in Bolivia.
