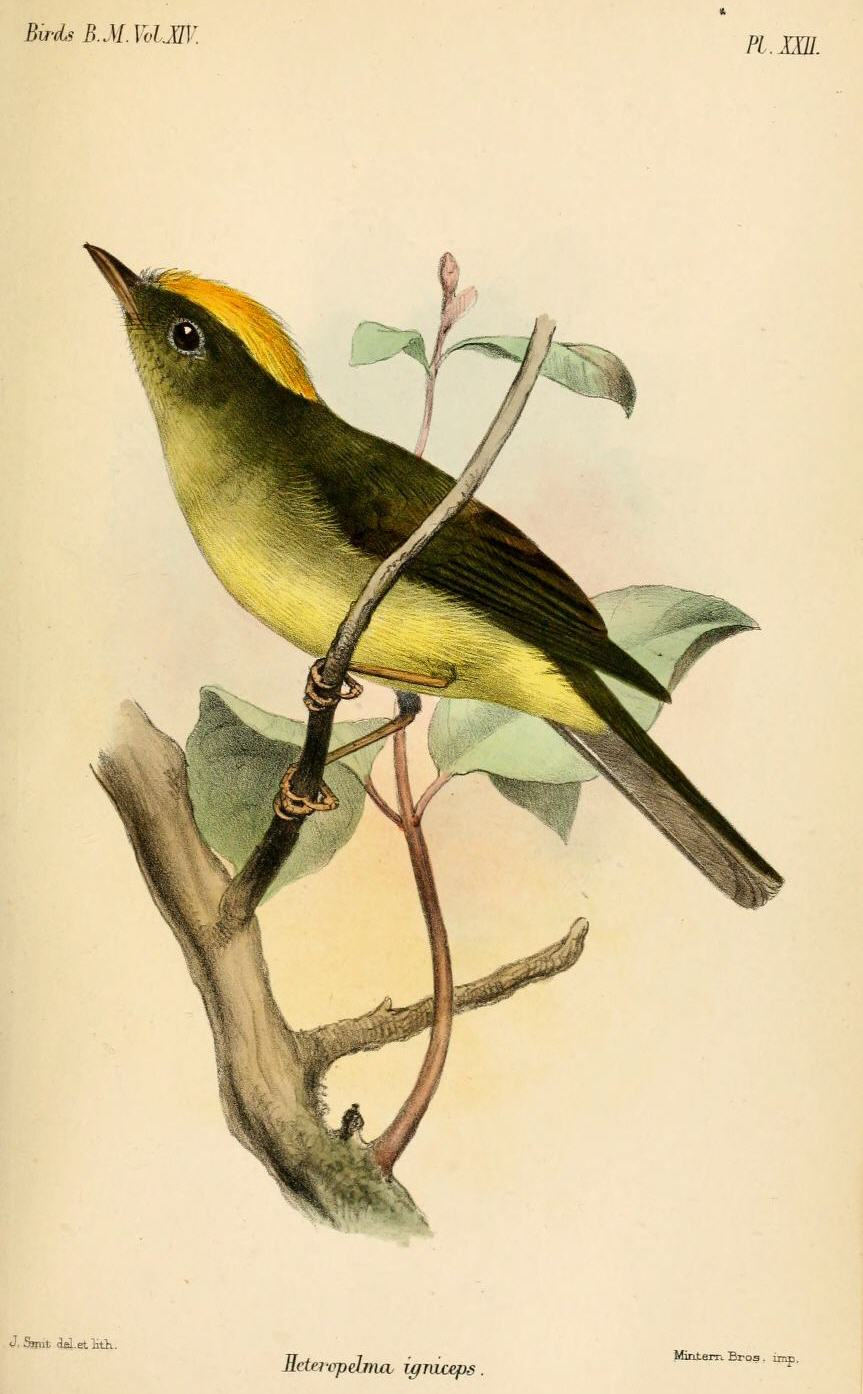

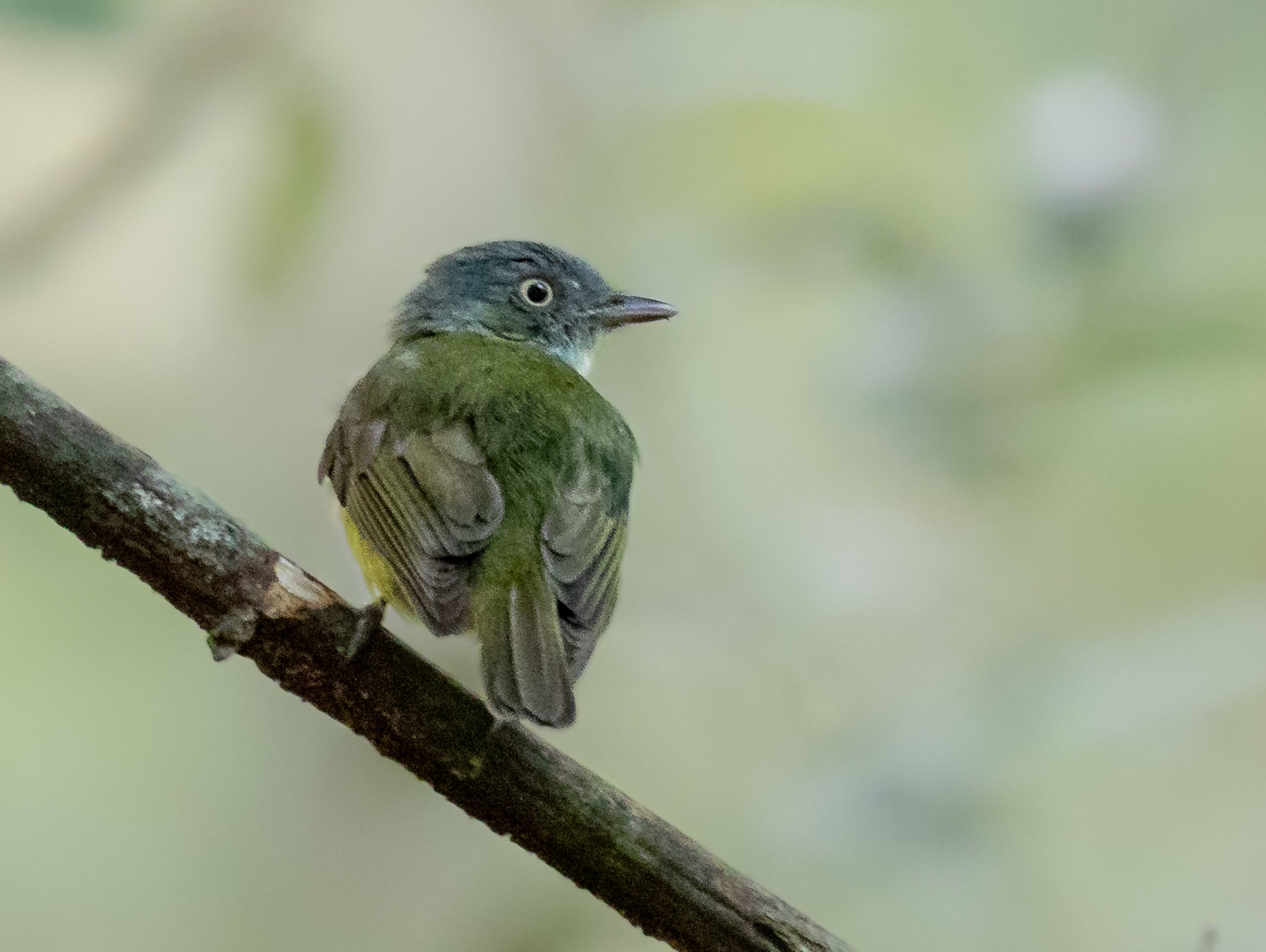

Conservation status
- Least Concern (IUCN 3.1)

Scientific classification
- Kingdom: Animalia
- Phylum: Chordata
- Class: Aves
- Order: Passeriformes
- Family: Pipridae
- Genus: Neopelma
- Species: N. chrysocephalum

Binomial name
- Neopelma chrysocephalum (Pelzeln, 1868)

= Saffron-crested tyrant-manakin =

Species of bird

The saffron-crested tyrant-manakin, or the saffron-crested neopelma (Neopelma chrysocephalum), is a species of bird in the family Pipridae, the manakins. A visually striking bird species, it is endemic to the lowland tropical rainforests of South America, with primary distribution areas in countries such as Brazil, Peru, and Bolivia.

== Taxonomy ==
The Saffron-crested Tyrant-Manakin belongs to the Pipridae family, which includes various manakin species, all known for their unique characteristics and behaviors. It was named by August von Pelzeln in 1868. The Spanish name for this species is Saltarín-Tirano de Cresta Azafrán.

== Description ==
It's a small short-tailed manakin, with a light yellowish breast; it looks very similar to a flycatcher. One of the most notable features of the Saffron-crested Tyrant-Manakin is its saffron yellow crest that stands on its head. This crest is similar to the bird's plumage. This small bird, measuring around 10 to 11 centimeters (4 to 4.3 inches) in length, has distinctive black wings and tail with yellow markings. Its eyes are a dark shade. The beak of the Saffron-crested Manakin is short and stout. It has a very nasal call with a variety of repeated "wraaang", "skeeehh" and 'eerhhh" sounds.

== Distribution and habitat ==
It is found in the Guianas, southern Venezuela and the northwestern Amazon Basin. Its natural habitats are tropical forests and shrubland.

The range in northern South America is the coastal Guianan region extending into coastal northeastern Brazil, the north of Amapá state. The range extends westward from Guyana into southeast Venezuela, eastern Colombia and then extends southeasterly down the Rio Negro (Amazon) river wildlife corridor to the Amazon River and then to the Madeira River, it also goes upstream on the Amazon River 250 km to the Purus River.

In the Amazon Basin, the North Region, Brazil, the species is in the states of Amapá, Amazonas, and very southern Roraima. Populations are in northern Peru along river headwaters, (the region of the Ucayali River).

These birds are generally found in the tropical rainforests, particularly in countries such as Brazil, Peru, and Bolivia. The preferred habitat of these birds are located in the tropical rainforests.

== Behavior ==
These birds often exhibit interesting social behaviors within their flocks or mating groups. They communicate using various calls and displays to maintain social bonds or establish territories.

This bird is generally a solitary and rather secretive bird, spending much of its time foraging in the understory and midstory of forest, particularly in sandy, nutrient-poor forests. It feeds on small fruits and insects, catching insects with short, rapid movements toward leaves and branches. Males are especially interesting during courtship: rather than gathering closely together, they perform solitary displays while remaining within hearing distance of other males, sometimes around 40–60 metres apart. During these displays, a male may make short upward leaps from a perch with his golden crest raised and spread, while flicking his wings, pumping his tail and twitching his head and neck. He also produces distinctive nasal, twanging calls, which may help males maintain contact or advertise their presence. Interestingly, despite being a manakin, its display is relatively understated compared with the elaborate group performances of some better-known manakins.

== Diet ==
Saffron-crested tyrant-Manakins mainly feed on insects, small fruits, and berries. They search for their meals within the forest and are known for their quick ability to catch insects.
