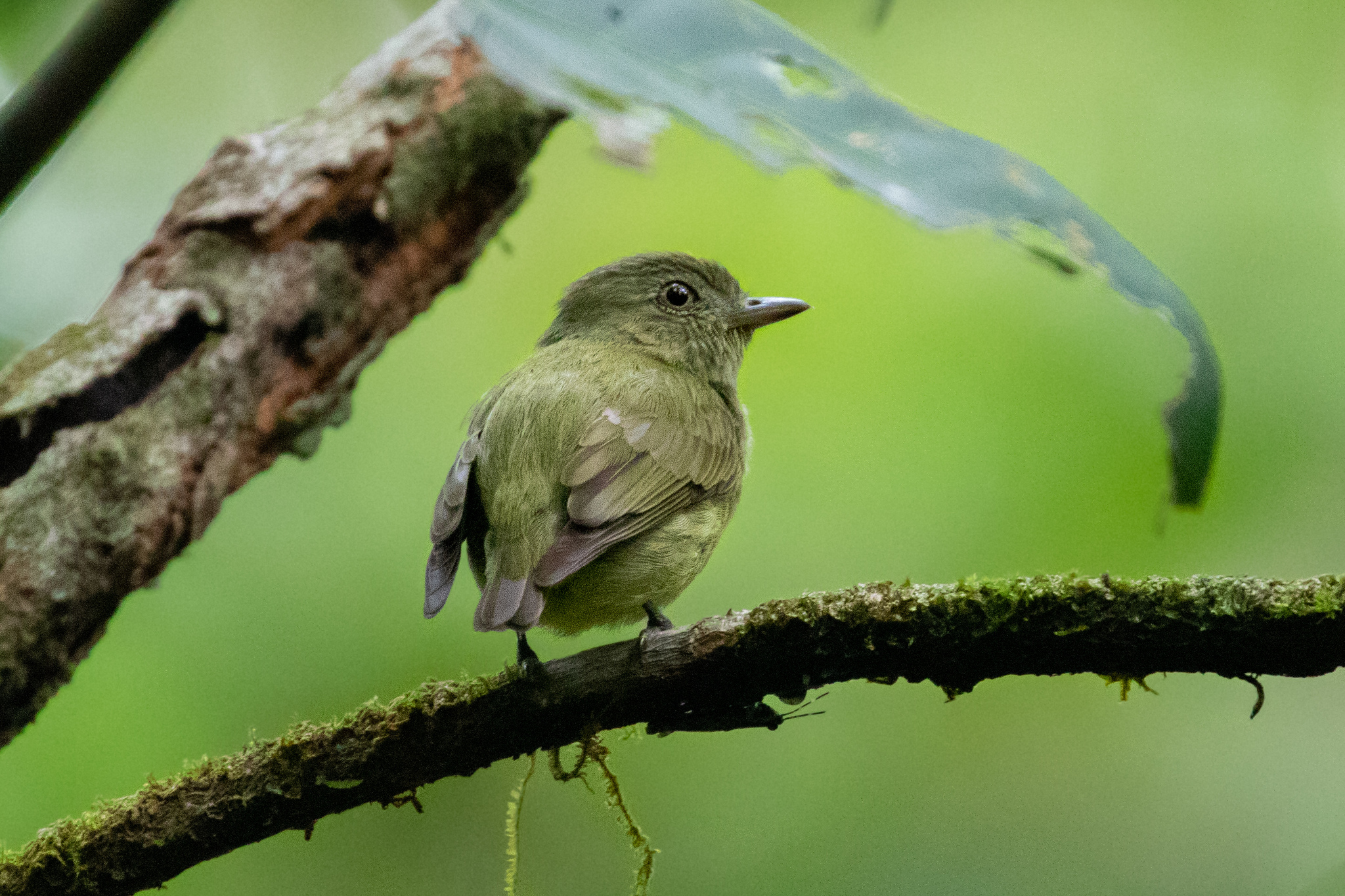

Conservation status
- Least Concern (IUCN 3.1)

Scientific classification
- Kingdom: Animalia
- Phylum: Chordata
- Class: Aves
- Order: Passeriformes
- Family: Pipridae
- Genus: Tyranneutes
- Species: T. stolzmanni

Binomial name
- Tyranneutes stolzmanni (Hellmayr, 1906)

Audio
- Call recorded in Ecuador

= Dwarf tyrant-manakin =

Species of bird

The dwarf tyrant-manakin or dwarf tyranneutes (Tyranneutes stolzmanni) is a species of bird in the family Pipridae, the manakins. It is found in Bolivia, Brazil, Colombia, Ecuador, Peru, and Venezuela.

== Taxonomy and systematics ==
The dwarf tyrant-manakin was originally described in 1906 as Pipra stolzmanni. It was later transferred to genus Tyranneutes that Sclater and Salvin had erected in 1881.

The dwarf tyrant-manakin is monotypic. It shares genus Tyranneutes with the tiny tyrant-manakin (T. virescens) and the two form a superspecies.

== Description ==
The dwarf tyrant-manakin is 7.5 to 9 cm (3.0 to 3.5 in) long and weighs 6.9 to 10 g (0.24 to 0.35 oz). The sexes have the same plumage. Adults have an olive head, upperparts, wings, and tail. Their throat and breast are paler grayish olive and their belly pale yellow. They have a highly variable iris with colors ranging from yellowish white to pale grayish or pale brown. They have a dark maxilla, a paler mandible, and grayish legs and feet.

== Distribution and habitat ==
The dwarf tyrant-manakin is a bird of the western and central Amazon Basin. It is found from the southeastern third of Colombia south through eastern Ecuador and eastern Peru into northern Bolivia and east from there across southern Venezuela and Brazil. In Brazil its range's edge in the north roughly follows from Roraima west of the Branco and Negro rivers to the Amazon River and south of it to the Atlantic in northeastern Pará and northern Maranhão. In the south its range roughly follows from Rondônia southeast to southern Mato Grosso and from there northeast to the Atlantic in Maranhão.

The dwarf tyrant-manakin primarily inhabits the interior of humid terra firme forest and to a lesser extent várzea forest. It seldom is found at the forest edge or in clearings. It is primarily a bird of the lowlands, reaching only 400 m (1,300 ft) in Colombia, 400 m (1,300 ft) in Ecuador, 800 m (2,600 ft) in Peru, and 300 m (1,000 ft) in Venezuela.

== Behavior ==
=== Movement ===
The dwarf tyrant-manakin is a year-round resident.

=== Feeding ===
The dwarf tyrant-manakin feeds mostly on small fruits and also includes some small invertebrates in its diet. It usually forages up to the forest's mid-story but will do so in the canopy.

=== Breeding ===
The dwarf tyrant-manakin's only breeding record came from April in Ecuador. The nest was a very small cup made from rootlets placed about 1.5 m (5 ft) above the ground in a sapling. Males have been seen displaying to females by flying straight up with quick wingbeats from a high perch and plunging back down to the same perch.

=== Vocalization ===
The dwarf tyrant-manakin is very difficult to see and is almost always only heard. Its song is a "curt zweeh-wit (wit much higher) or zweeh-dewít". Its call is a "very high, hurried prutrut---" with three to six rut notes.

== Status ==
The IUCN has assessed the dwarf tyrant-manakin as being of Least Concern. It has an extremely large range; its population size is not known and is believed to be decreasing. No immediate threats have been identified. It is considered common in Colombia, Ecuador, and Brazil and fairly common in Peru and Venezuela.
