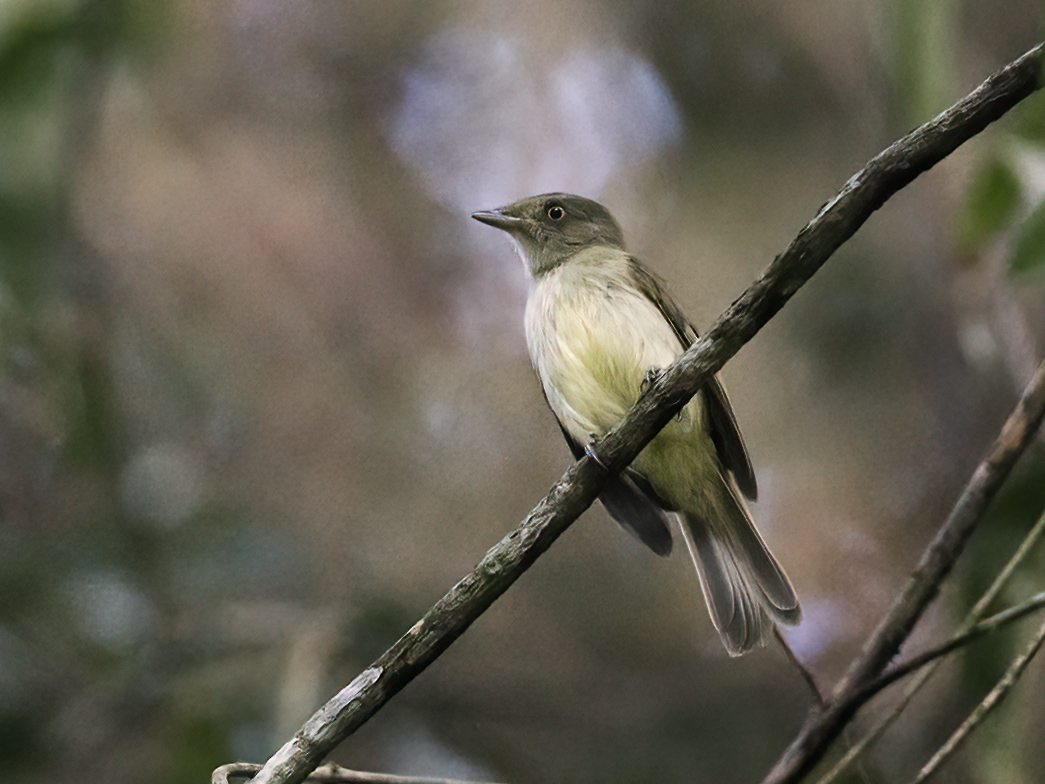

Conservation status
- Least Concern (IUCN 3.1)

Scientific classification
- Kingdom: Animalia
- Phylum: Chordata
- Class: Aves
- Order: Passeriformes
- Family: Pipridae
- Genus: Neopelma
- Species: N. sulphureiventer

Binomial name
- Neopelma sulphureiventer (Hellmayr, 1903)

= Sulphur-bellied tyrant-manakin =

Species of bird

The sulphur-bellied tyrant-manakin (Neopelma sulphureiventer) is a species of bird in the family Pipridae. It is found in Bolivia, Brazil and Peru.

== Taxonomy and systematics ==
The sulphur-bellied tyrant-manakin was originally described as Scotothorus sulphureiventer. It was later reassigned to genus Neopelma that had been erected in 1860.

The sulphur-bellied tyrant-manakin is monotypic.

== Description ==
The sulphur-bellied tyrant-manakin is 13 to 13.5 cm (5.1 to 5.3 in) long and weighs 14 to 19.4 g (0.49 to 0.68 oz). The sexes have the same plumage. Adults have a partially hidden, pale sulphur-yellow stripe on the crown. The rest of their face and their upperparts are dull olive-green. Their wings and tail are a slightly browner olive-green. Their throat is dull grayish white, their upper breast grayish olive, and their lower breast and belly pale sulphur-yellow. They have a pale grayish to creamy or orange-brown iris, a brownish and longish bill, and grayish legs and feet.

== Distribution and habitat ==
The sulphur-bellied tyrant-manakin is a bird of the far western Amazon Basin. One population separate from its main range is found in Peru's Loreto and San Martín departments. Its contiguous range begins in Peru's extreme eastern Cuzco Department and continues east through Ucayali and Madre de Dios departments. From there it continues east into western Brazil's Acre, Amazonas, and Rondônia states. Its range also continues southeast through the northern half of Bolivia. There are also a few widely scattered records in other Brazilian states.

The sulphur-bellied tyrant-manakin inhabits humid evergreen forest, especially along rivers with large thickets of bamboo. The separate population in Peru also inhabits semi-deciduous scrublands. In elevation in Peru it mostly occurs below 700 m (2,300 ft) but locally reaches 1,000 m (3,300 ft). In Brazil it occurs below 450 m (1,500 ft).

== Behavior ==
=== Movement ===
The sulphur-bellied tyrant-manakin is believed to be a year-round resident.

=== Feeding ===
The sulphur-bellied tyrant-manakin's diet and foraging behavior have not been studied but it is believed to feed mostly on insects and some fruit as well.

=== Breeding ===
The sulphur-bellied tyrant-manakin's breeding season appears to span at least from June to October. Nothing else is known about the species' breeding biology.

=== Vocalization ===
The sulphur-bellied tyrant-manakin's calls include "a squeaky dueek or duet in short series [and] a scratchy series of djurt or djurit notes".

== Status ==
The IUCN has assessed the sulphur-bellied tyrant-manakin as being of Least Concern. It has a large range; its population size is not known and is believed to be decreasing. No immediate threats have been identified. It is considered uncommon and local in Peru and rare to uncommon in Brazil. It occurs in at least two protected areas in Peru.
