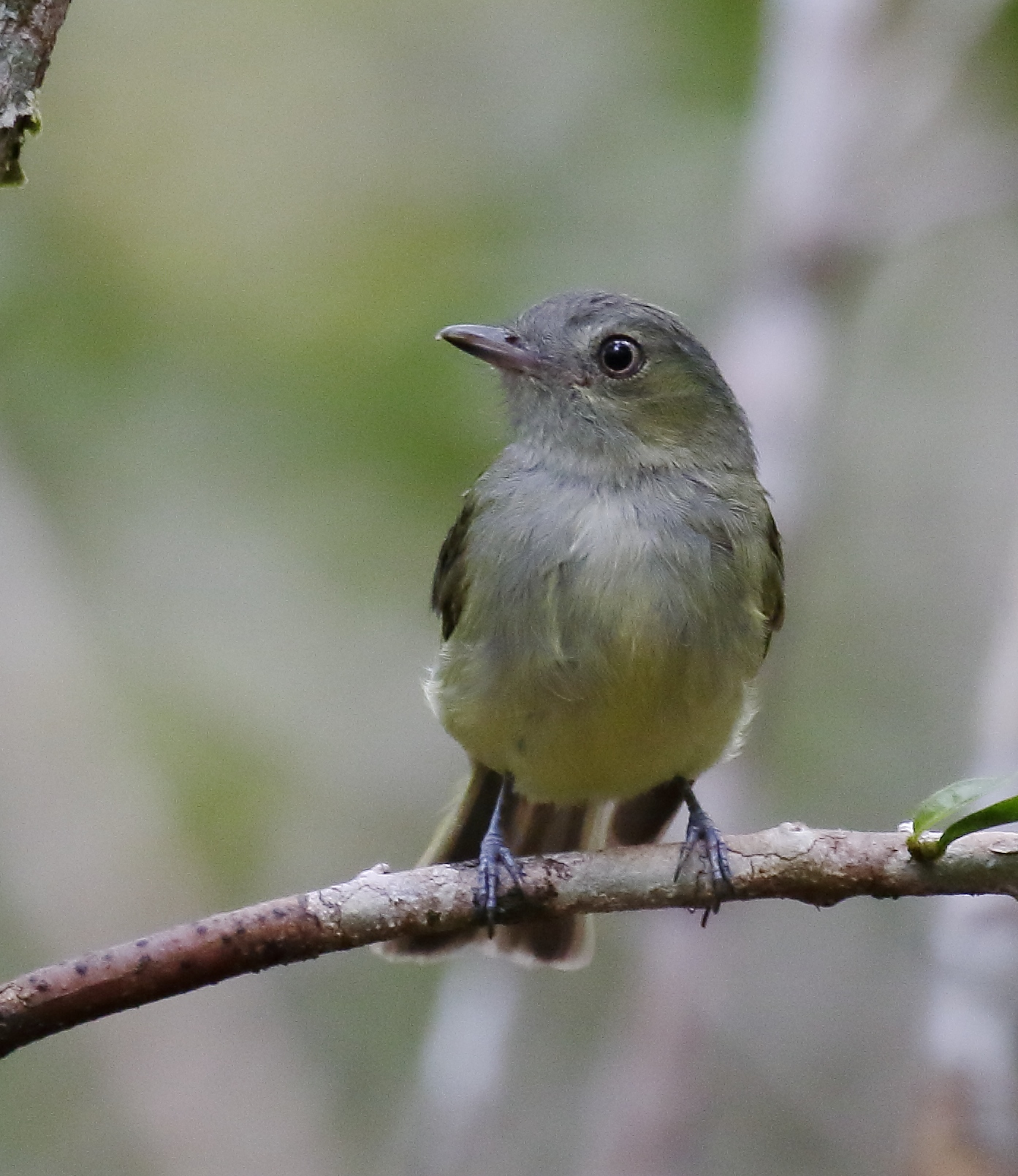

Conservation status
- Near Threatened (IUCN 3.1)

Scientific classification
- Kingdom: Animalia
- Phylum: Chordata
- Class: Aves
- Order: Passeriformes
- Family: Pipridae
- Genus: Neopelma
- Species: N. aurifrons

Binomial name
- Neopelma aurifrons (Wied, 1831)

= Wied's tyrant-manakin =

Species of bird

Wied's tyrant-manakin (Neopelma aurifrons) is a Near-threatened species of bird in the family Pipridae, the manakins. It is endemic to Brazil.

== Taxonomy and systematics ==
Wied's tyrant-manakin was originally described in 1831 as Muscicapa aurifrons, mistakenly placing it in the Old World flycatcher family. It was reassigned to genus Neopelma that was erected in 1860 with it as the type species. In 1944 what is now the Serra do Mar tyrant-manakin Neopelma chrysolophum was described as a subspecies of Wied's tyrant-manakin. They were separated based on a study published in 1995.

Wied's tyrant-manakin is monotypic.

== Description ==
Wied's tyrant-manakin is about 13 cm (5.1 in) long. The sexes have the same plumage. Adults have a small yellow to orange-yellow stripe in the middle of the crown. The rest of their face, their upperparts, wings, and tail are olive-green. Their throat is dull grayish white, their upper breast grayish olive, and their lower breast and belly pale sulphur-yellow. They have a pale grayish mauve iris, a grayish bill, and grayish legs and feet.

== Distribution and habitat ==
Wied's tyrant-manakin is found intermittently in coastal eastern Brazil from southern Bahia south to eastern Minas Gerais and Espírito Santo. There are also historical records further south in Rio de Janeiro state. It primarily inhabits the interior of undisturbed or slightly disturbed humid forest and occasionally is found at the forest's edge. In elevation it ranges from sea level to 1,000 m (3,300 ft).

== Behavior ==
=== Movement ===
Wied's tyrant-manakin is believed to be a year-round resident.

=== Feeding ===
Wied's tyrant-manakin feeds mostly on small fruits and also includes insects in its diet. It mostly forages within about 7 m (25 ft) of the ground. It plucks or grabs its food from vegetation with a short sally from a perch; sometimes it briefly hovers.

=== Breeding ===
Wied's tyrant-manakin males sing from a branch in the forest's understory to mid-story, usually in a somewhat open but shaded area, and typically between about 3.5 and 7 m (10 and 25 ft) above the ground. Nothing else is known about the species' breeding biology.

=== Vocalization ===
The song of Wied's tyrant-manakin is a "yodeling yo-deé-wo-dée, 1st deé (or tjiw) much higher, second slightly higher".

== Status ==
The IUCN originally in 2000 assessed Wied's tyrant-manakin as Endangered, then in 2004 as Vulnerable, and since 2021 as Near Threatened. It is found in twenty or fewer sites, occupying about 1,500 km^{2} (580 sq mi) within its overall range of 142,000 km^{2} (55,000 sq mi). Its population size is not known and is believed to be decreasing. "Its lowland forest habitat has been historically threatened by agricultural conversion, deforestation for mining and plantation production. Current key threats to these forests are urbanisation, agricultural expansion, selective logging, dam construction, colonisation and associated road building." Alterations in its habitat due to climate change is a further potential threat. It is considered rare to uncommon. "Conservation priorities include establishment of effective protection of the small population found NE of Rio de Janeiro city; field surveys also required in order to determine whether the species survives at other sites within its range."
