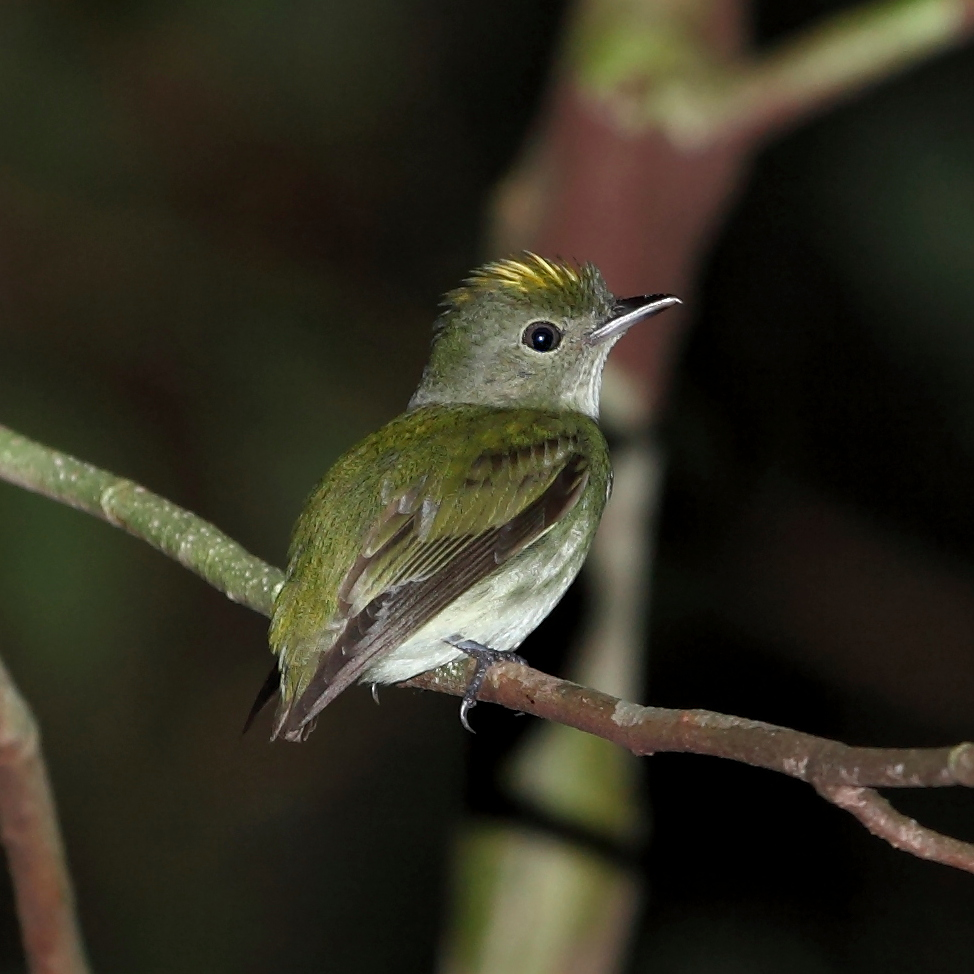
- at Manaus, Amazonas state, Brazil

Conservation status
- Least Concern (IUCN 3.1)

Scientific classification
- Kingdom: Animalia
- Phylum: Chordata
- Class: Aves
- Order: Passeriformes
- Family: Pipridae
- Genus: Tyranneutes
- Species: T. virescens

Binomial name
- Tyranneutes virescens (Pelzeln, 1868)

= Tiny tyrant-manakin =

Species of bird

The tiny tyrant-manakin or tiny tyranneutes (Tyranneutes virescens) is a species of bird in the family Pipridae, the manakins. It is found in Brazil, French Guiana, Guyana, Suriname, and Venezuela.

== Taxonomy and systematics ==
The tiny tyrant-manakin was originally described by Pelzeln in 1868 as Pipra virescens. It was later transferred to genus Tyranneutes that Sclater and Salvin erected in 1881. They named T. brachyurus as the type specimen and it was later realized that T. brachyurus was the same species as Pelzeln's P. virescens so the earlier specific epithet took precedence.

The tiny tyrant-manakin is monotypic. It shares genus Tyranneutes with the dwarf tyrant-manakin (T. stolzmanni) and the two form a superspecies.

== Description ==
The tiny tyrant-manakin is about 7 to 8 cm (2.8 to 3.1 in) long and weighs 6 to 8.5 g (0.21 to 0.30 oz). The sexes have almost the same plumage. Adult males have a mostly hidden yellow patch on the crown. The rest of their olive head and their upperparts, wings, and tail are dull olive. Their throat and breast are paler grayish olive and their belly pale yellow. They have a dark iris, a dark maxilla, a paler mandible, and grayish legs and feet. Females have less yellow on their crown than males but are otherwise alike.

== Distribution and habitat ==
The tiny tyrant-manakin is a bird of the northern Amazon Basin. It is found from northeastern and southeastern Bolívar in Venezuela east through the Guianas and Brazil north of the Amazon River from the Branco and Negro rivers to the Atlantic in Pará. It primarily inhabits the interior of humid terra firme forest. It seldom is found at the forest edge or in clearings. It is a bird of the lowlands, reaching only about 500 m (1,600 ft) in elevation.

== Behavior ==
=== Movement ===
The tiny tyrant-manakin is believed to be a year-round resident.

=== Feeding ===
The tiny tyrant-manakin feeds mostly on small fruits and also includes some small invertebrates in its diet. It usually forages up to the forest's mid-story. It has been observed gleaning food with a short sally from a perch, sometimes while briefly hovering.

=== Breeding ===
Males make a display flight by flying straight up with quick wingbeats from a high perch and plunging back down to the same perch. They also display while perched and with slow floating flights between perches.

=== Vocalization ===
The tiny tyrant-manakin's vocalization is a "high, short, nasal shiver wee-de-weet or quick better delete".

== Status ==
The IUCN has assessed the tiny tyrant-manakin as being of Least Concern. It has a large range; its population size is not known and is believed to be decreasing. No immediate threats have been identified. It is considered "uncommon and perhaps local" in Venezuela and uncommon to frequent" in Brazil.
