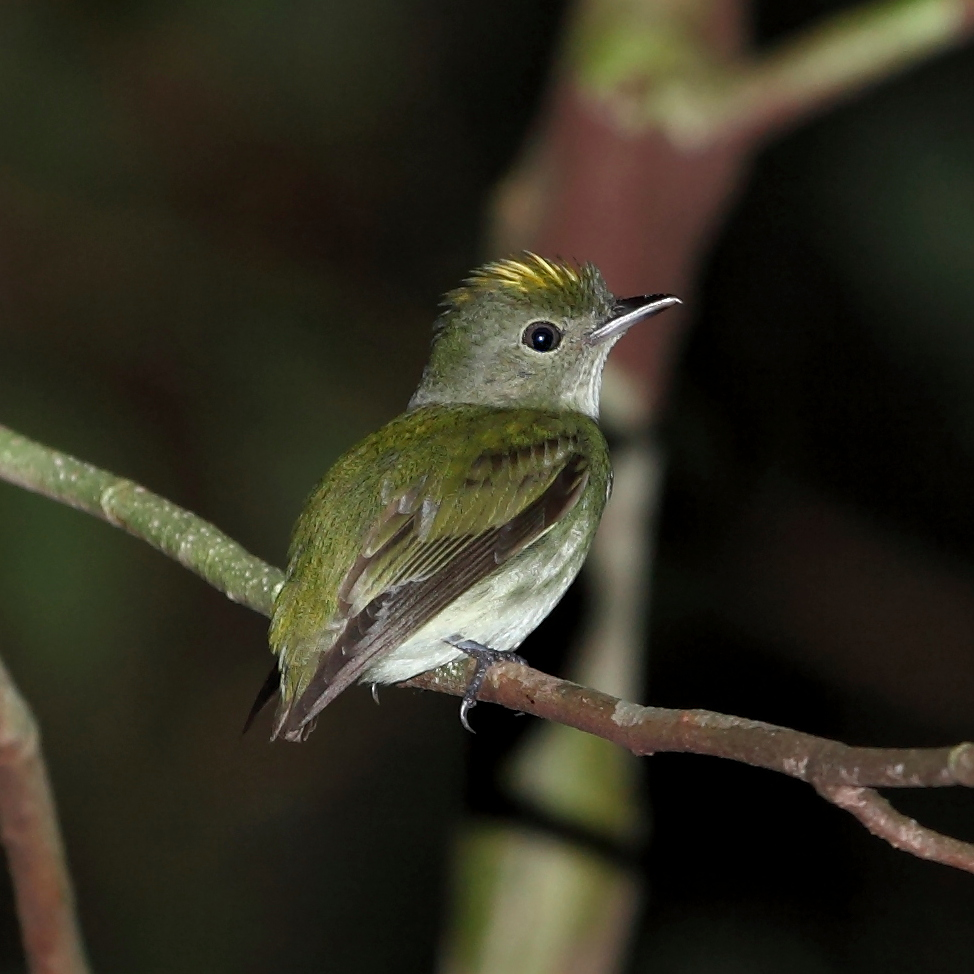
- Tiny tyrant-manakin (Tyranneutes virescens)

Scientific classification
- Kingdom: Animalia
- Phylum: Chordata
- Class: Aves
- Order: Passeriformes
- Family: Pipridae
- Genus: Tyranneutes; P.L. Sclater & Salvin, 1881

Type species
- Tyranneutes brachyurus P.L. Sclater & Salvin, 1881

= Tyranneutes =

Genus of birds

Tyranneutes is a genus of South American birds in the family Pipridae. Both sexes somewhat resemble females of other manakins, but are even smaller. They are native to the humid forests in the Amazon and the Guianas. The two species are entirely allopatric (their distributions separated by major rivers).

== Etymology ==
Tyranneutes: Greek: τυραννευω turanneuō "to be a tyrant", from τυραννος turannos "tyrant".

== Species ==
Genus Tyranneutes – P.L. Sclater & Salvin, 1881 – two species
Common name	Scientific name and subspecies	Range	Size and ecology	IUCN status and estimated population
Dwarf tyrant-manakin	Tyranneutes stolzmanni (Hellmayr, 1906)	Amazon Basin, except the area east of the Rio Negro.	Size: Habitat: Diet:	LC
Tiny tyrant-manakin	Tyranneutes virescens (Pelzeln, 1868)	Brazil, French Guiana, Guyana, Suriname, and Venezuela.	Size: Habitat: Diet:	LC
