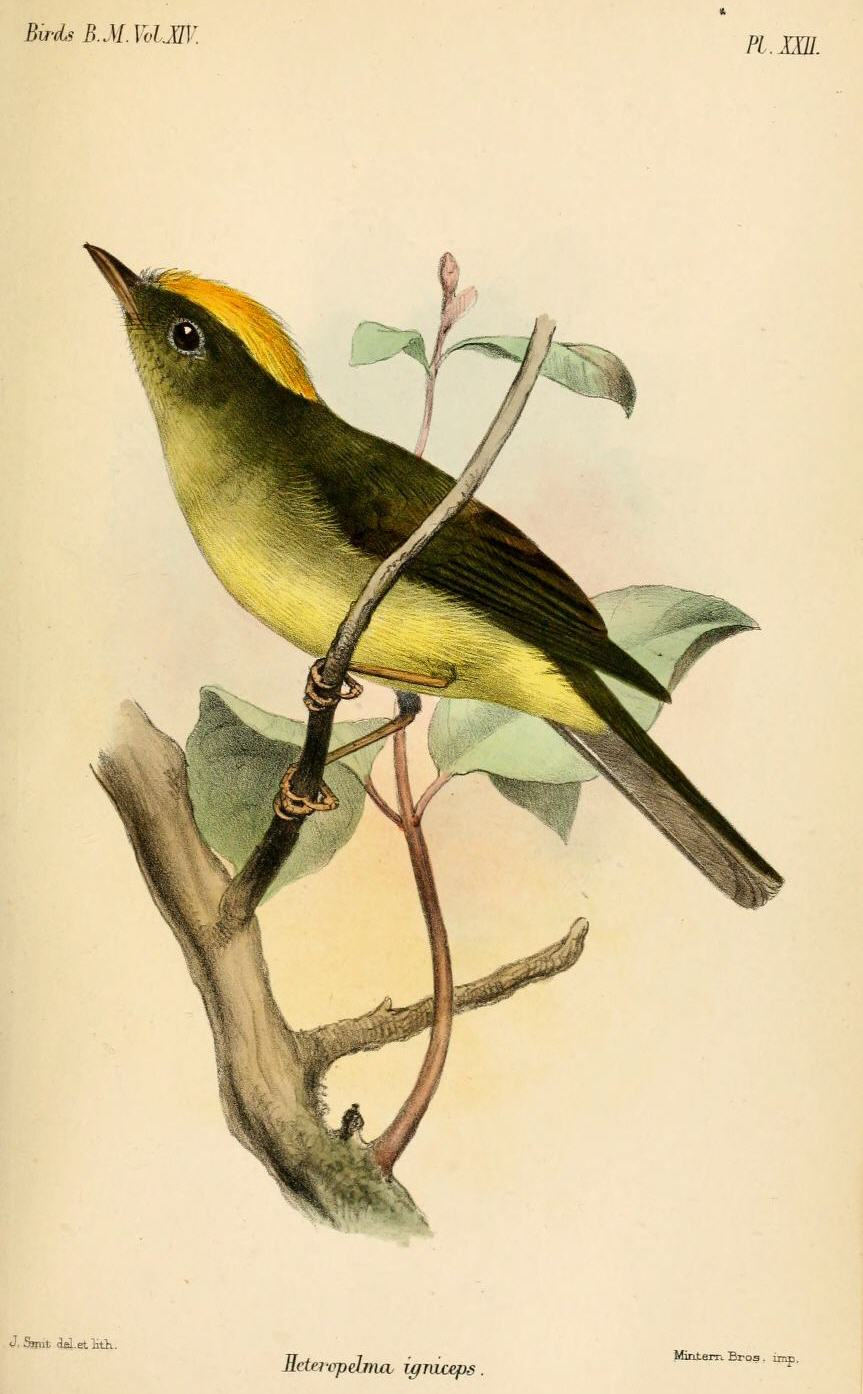
- Saffron-crested tyrant-manakin (Neopelma chrysocephalum)

Scientific classification
- Kingdom: Animalia
- Phylum: Chordata
- Class: Aves
- Order: Passeriformes
- Family: Pipridae
- Genus: Neopelma; P.L. Sclater, 1861

Type species
- Muscicapa aurifrons Sclater, 1861

= Neopelma =

Genus of birds

Neopelma is a genus of bird in the family Pipridae.

== Etymology ==
Neopelma: from Greek: νεος (neos 'new, different'); πελμα, πελματος (pelma, pelmatos 'sole of the foot').

== Species ==
It contains the following species:

| Image | Scientific name | Common name | Distribution |
|---|---|---|---|
| | Neopelma aurifrons | Wied's tyrant-manakin | Atlantic moist forests in eastern Brazil. |
| | Neopelma pallescens | Pale-bellied tyrant-manakin | Brazil and far northeastern Bolivia |
| | Neopelma chrysocephalum | Saffron-crested tyrant-manakin | Guianas, southern Venezuela and the northwestern Amazon Basin |
| | Neopelma sulphureiventer | Sulphur-bellied tyrant-manakin | western Amazon Basin of Bolivia, Brazil and Peru |
