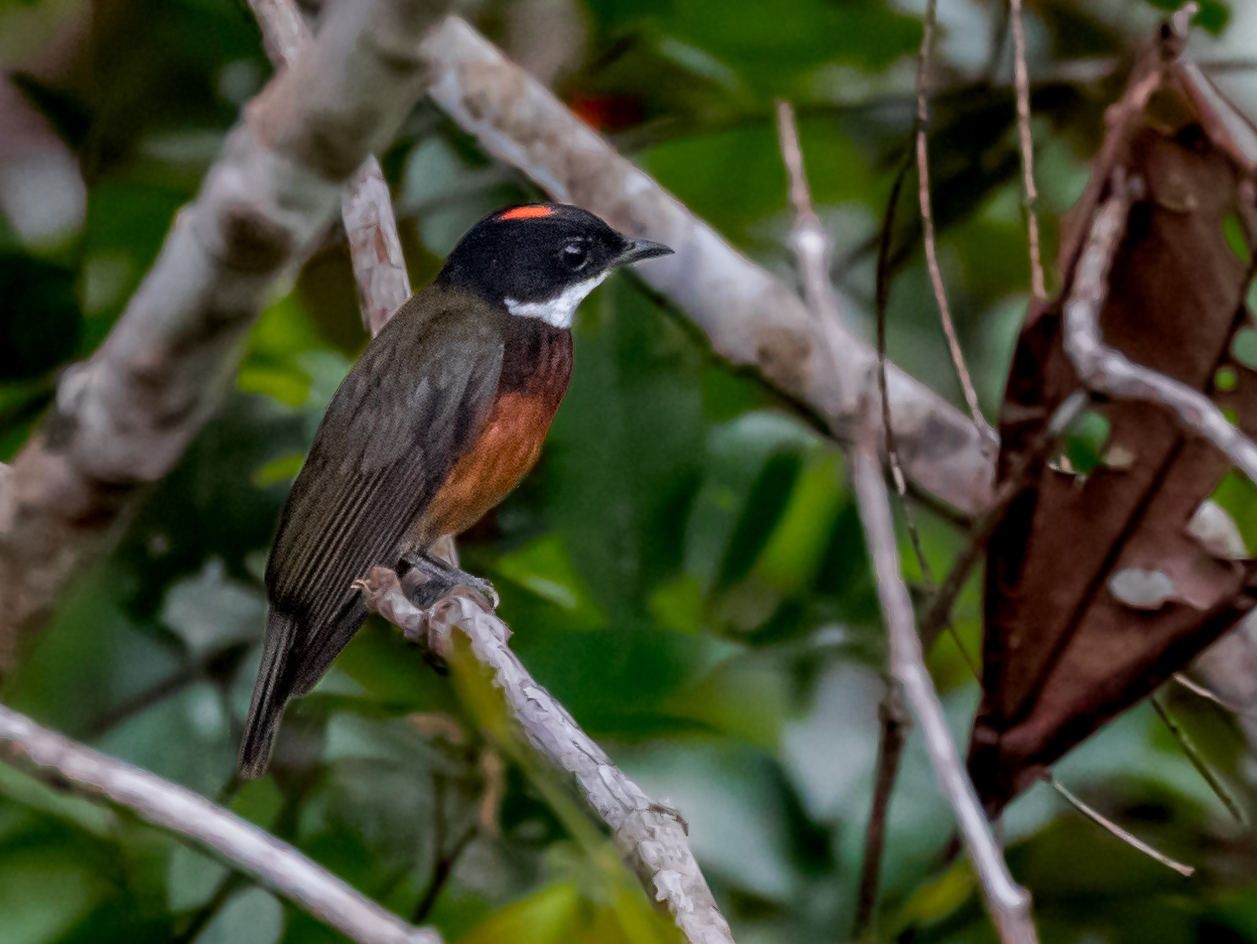

Conservation status
- Least Concern (IUCN 3.1)

Scientific classification
- Kingdom: Animalia
- Phylum: Chordata
- Class: Aves
- Order: Passeriformes
- Family: Pipridae
- Genus: Heterocercus
- Species: H. linteatus

Binomial name
- Heterocercus linteatus (Strickland, 1850)

= Flame-crested manakin =

Species of bird

The flame-crested manakin, or flame-crowned manakin, (Heterocercus linteatus) is a species of bird in the family Pipridae. It is found in Bolivia, Brazil, and Peru.

== Taxonomy and systematics ==
The flame-crested manakin was originally described as Elaenia linteata, erroneously placing it in the New World flycatcher family.

The flame-crested manakin is monotypic. It shares genus Heterocercus with the orange-crested manakin (H. aurantiivertex) and the yellow-crested manakin (H. flavivertex). The three form a superspecies.

== Description ==
The flame-crested manakin is about 14 cm (5.5 in) long and weighs 20 to 24 g (0.71 to 0.85 oz). The species is sexually dimorphic. Adult males have a mostly black head with an often hidden red stripe on the crown and a white throat. The throat feathers are long and silky. Their upperparts and flanks are dark olive. They have a sooty olive upper breast and a deep chestnut lower breast that becomes cinnamon-rufous on the belly. Adult females have no red on their crown. The head is mostly the same dark olive as their upperparts though their face is duskier and their throat gray. Their flanks are grayish olive and their underparts cinnamon-buff. Both sexes have a dark brown iris, a long narrow dark bill, and dark legs and feet.

== Distribution and habitat ==
By far the largest part of the flame-crested manakin's range is in central Brazil. There it is found south of the Amazon River from the basin of the Xingu River west to Peru and northern Bolivia and south to southeastern Mato Grosso. As of 2010 there were two records in Peru's extreme southeastern Madre de Dios Department on the Bolivian border. There apparently are records since then in Loreto Department in northeastern Peru.

The flame-crested manakin inhabits humid várzea forest and woodlands along watercourses. In elevation it reaches up to about 500 m (1,600 ft).

== Behavior ==
=== Movement ===
The flame-crested manakin is believed to be a year-round resident.

=== Feeding ===
The flame-crested manakin feeds on small fruits, insects, and spiders, though details are lacking. It forages in the forest's lower strata.

=== Breeding ===
Male flame-crested manakins display to females at leks; the display includes flaring their white throat feathers. Nothing else is known about the species' breeding biology.

=== Vocalization ===
Males call loudly during their display but the call has not been described.

== Status ==
The IUCN has assessed the flame-crested manakin as being of Least Concern. It has a very large range; its population size is not known and is believed to be decreasing. No immediate threats have been identified. It is considered uncommon to frequent in Brazil. It occurs in at least one protected area in each of Brazil and Bolivia.
