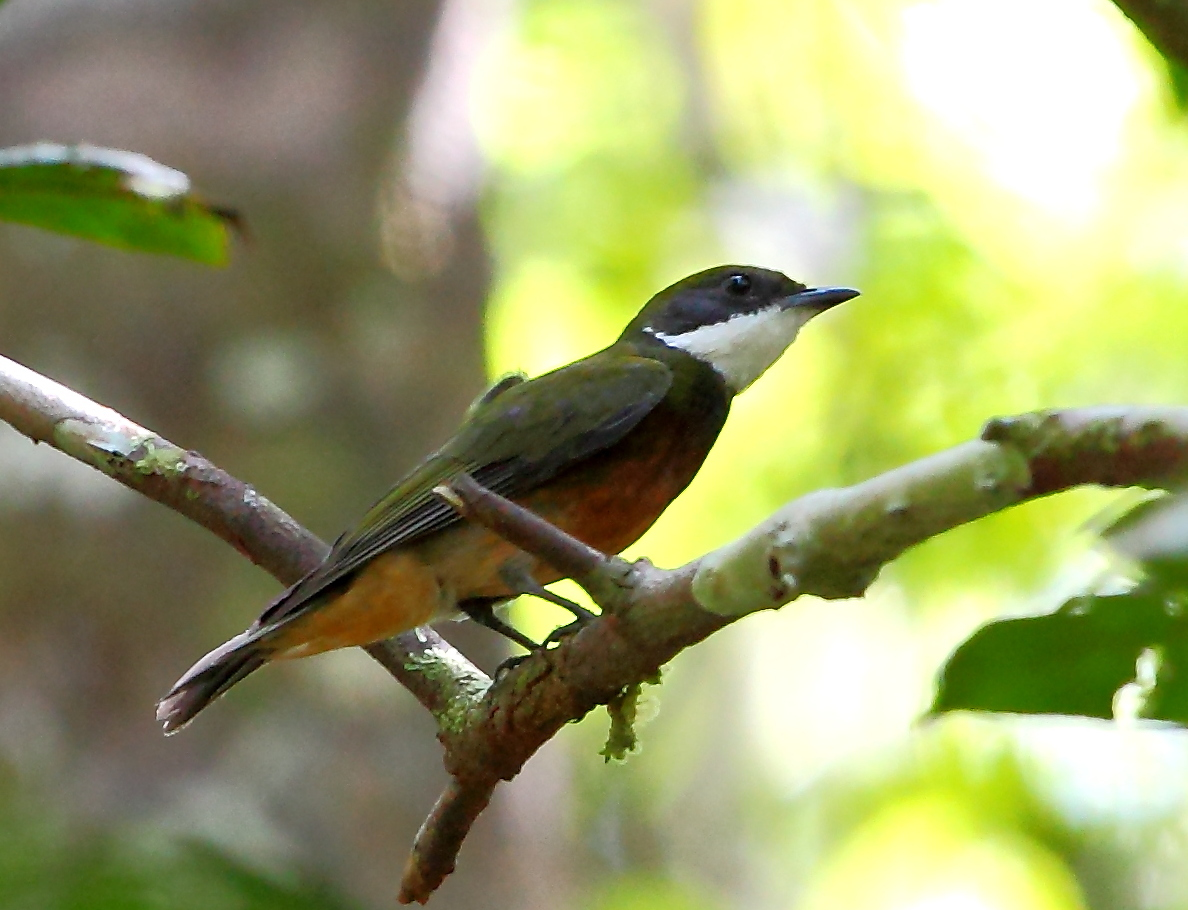
- at Presidente Figueiredo, Amazonas state, Brazil

Conservation status
- Least Concern (IUCN 3.1)

Scientific classification
- Kingdom: Animalia
- Phylum: Chordata
- Class: Aves
- Order: Passeriformes
- Family: Pipridae
- Genus: Heterocercus
- Species: H. flavivertex

Binomial name
- Heterocercus flavivertex Pelzeln, 1868

= Yellow-crested manakin =

Species of bird

The yellow-crested manakin (Heterocercus flavivertex), also called the yellow-crowned manakin, is a species of bird in the family Pipridae. It is found in Brazil, Colombia, and Venezuela.

== Taxonomy and systematics ==
The yellow-crested manakin is monotypic. It shares genus Heterocercus with the orange-crested manakin (H. aurantiivertex) and the flame-crested manakin (H. linteatus). The three form a superspecies.

== Description ==
The yellow-crested manakin is about 14 cm (5.5 in) long and weighs about 21 g (0.74 oz). The species is sexually dimorphic. Adult males have a mostly dark olive head with an often hidden golden-yellow stripe on the crown, a slaty face, and a white throat. The throat feathers are long and silky. Their upperparts are dark olive. They have a sooty olive upper breast, a deep chestnut lower breast that becomes cinnamon-rufous on the belly, and olive flanks. Adult females have no yellow on their crown. Their head is mostly the same dark olive as their upperparts though their throat is gray. Their underparts are cinnamon-buff. Both sexes have a dark brown iris, a long narrow dark bill, and dark legs and feet. Immatures resemble adult females.

== Distribution and habitat ==
The yellow-crested manakin is found in approximately the east-central quarter of Colombia and east into Venezuela and northern Brazil. In Venezuela it occurs in extreme southeastern Apure and in most of western and central Amazonas. In Brazil it occurs north of the Amazon River from Colombia and Venezuela in the basin of the Negro River east to western Pará.

The yellow-crested manakin inhabits humid várzea forest and other scrubby forest and woodland along watercourses including blackwater rivers. In elevation it reaches about 350 m (1,100 ft) in Colombia and 300 m (1,000 ft) in Venezuela.

== Behavior ==
=== Movement ===
The yellow-crested manakin is a year-round resident.

=== Feeding ===
The yellow-crested manakin feeds on small fruits and insects. It forages from the forest's understory to its mid-story. It takes food from vegetation and branches with an aerial sally from a perch and much less often while on a perch. It sometimes joins mixed species feeding flocks for a short time.

=== Breeding ===
The yellow-crested manakin breeds between February and May in Venezuela; its season elsewhere is not known. Males defend a display territory within which they strike various poses on a perch and make a flight display. The one known nest was only partially completed; it was a cup hung in a branch fork about 2 m (7 ft) above a stream. Nothing else is known about the species' breeding biology.

=== Vocal and non-vocal sounds ===
The male yellow-crested manakin's "advertising call" is " a loud, whistled weeee-pítch-ooo...with punctuated or hiccupping cadence", also written as "seee-tSITseeh". It makes a "chattering weer-weer-weer" when interacting aggressively and an "emphatic chip" during its flight display. The display flight also includes a "whoosh" sound that is believed to be mechanical.

== Status ==
The IUCN has assessed the yellow-crested manakin as being of Least Concern. It has a large range; its population size is not known and is believed to be decreasing. No immediate threats have been identified. It is considered fairly common in Colombia, locally fairly common in Venezuela, and uncommon to frequent in Brazil.
