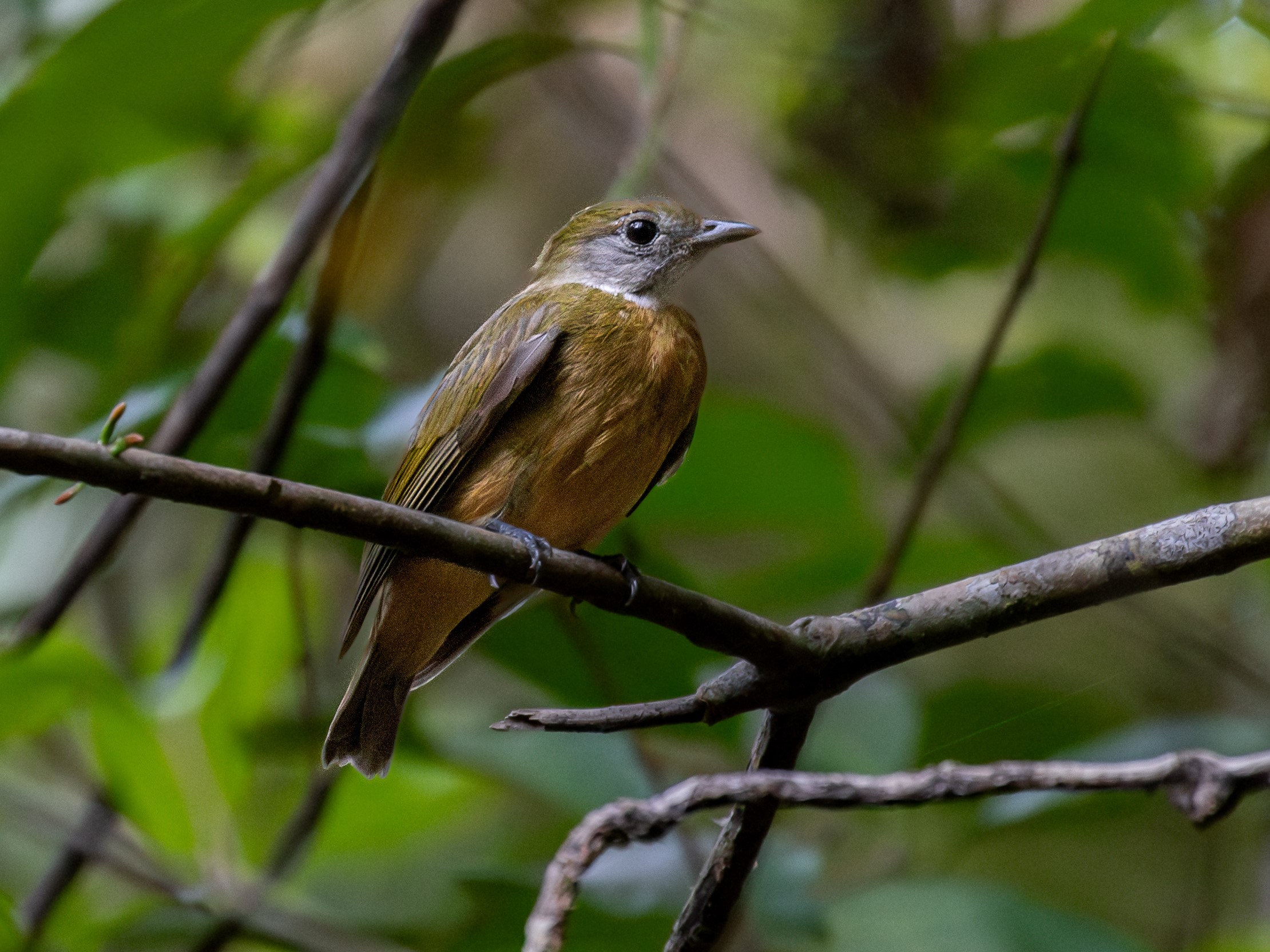

Conservation status
- Least Concern (IUCN 3.1)

Scientific classification
- Kingdom: Animalia
- Phylum: Chordata
- Class: Aves
- Order: Passeriformes
- Family: Pipridae
- Genus: Heterocercus
- Species: H. aurantiivertex

Binomial name
- Heterocercus aurantiivertex Sclater, PL & Salvin, 1880

= Orange-crested manakin =

Species of bird

The orange-crested manakin, or orange-crowned manakin, (Heterocercus aurantiivertex) is a species of bird in the family Pipridae. It is found in Brazil, Ecuador, Peru, and possibly Colombia.

== Taxonomy and systematics ==
The orange-crested manakin is monotypic. It shares genus Heterocercus with the flame-crested manakin (H. linteatus) and the yellow-crested manakin (H. flavivertex). The three form a superspecies.

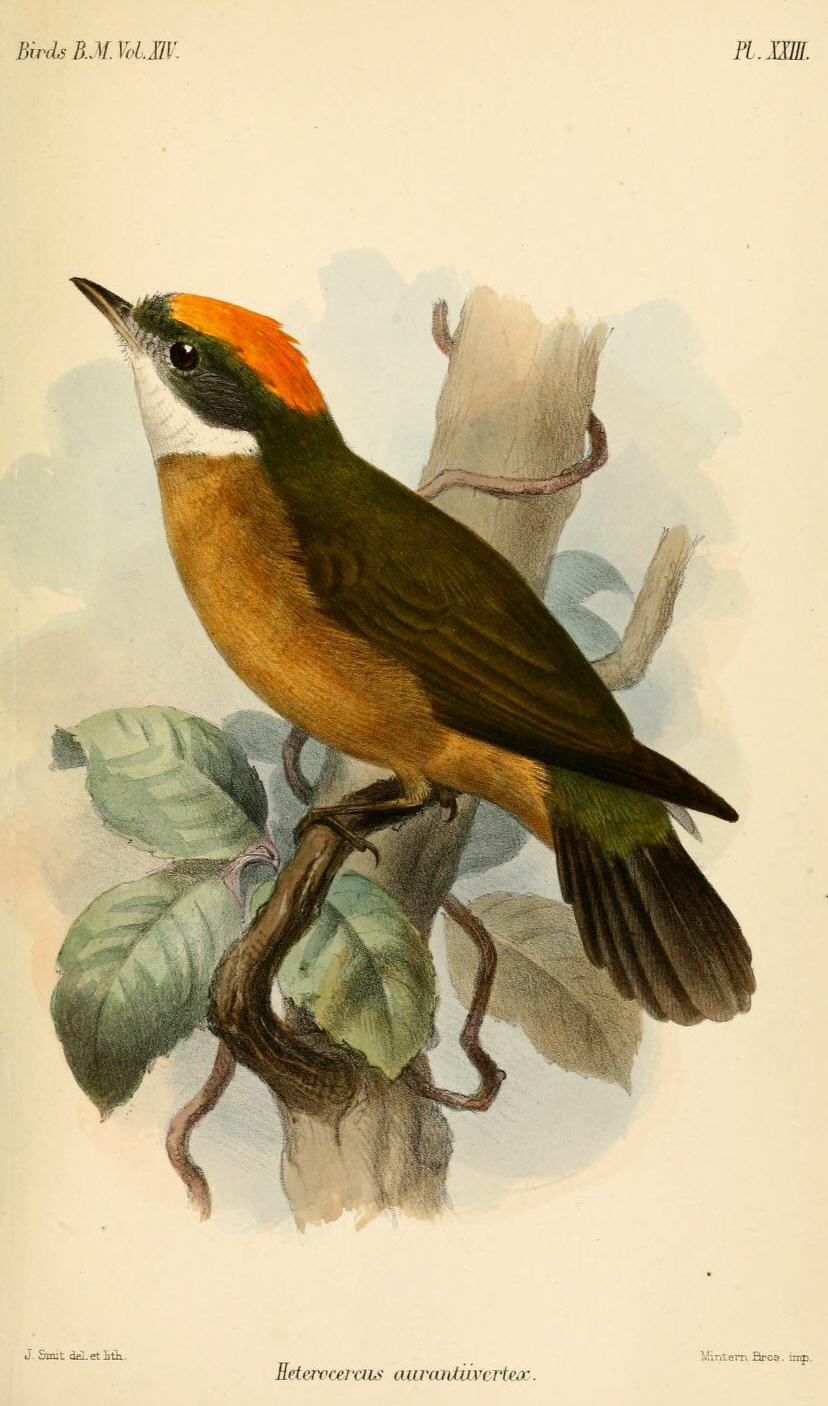
Illustration by Joseph Smit, 1881

== Description ==
The orange-crested manakin is about 14 cm (5.5 in) long and weighs 21 to 22 g (0.74 to 0.78 oz). The species is sexually dimorphic. Adult males have a mostly grayish olive head with an often hidden orange stripe on the crown and a grayish white throat. The throat feathers are long and silky. Their upperparts and flanks are dull olive. Their underparts are dull cinnamon-buff. Adult females have no orange on their crown. They are otherwise similar to males but their plumage is overall duller with paler underparts. Both sexes have a dark brown iris, a long narrow dark bill, and dark legs and feet. Immatures of both sexes resemble adult females.

== Distribution and habitat ==
The orange-crested manakin primarily is found in eastern Ecuador between Sucumbíos and Pastaza provinces and southeast well into northern Peru's Loreto Department. In Peru it is found mostly north of the Amazon River but has a few localities south of it. It also occurs very locally along the Amazon in Brazil all the way to the Atlantic. In addition, the South American Classification Committee has at least one unconfirmed record in Colombia.

The orange-crested manakin inhabits humid várzea forest and woodlands, mostly along blackwater rivers. In elevation it reaches up to about 300 m (1,000 ft).

== Behavior ==
=== Movement ===
The orange-crested manakin is believed to be a year-round resident.

=== Feeding ===
The orange-crested manakin feeds on small fruits, especially those of figs (Ficus), and insects. It takes them in aerial sallies from a perch.

=== Breeding ===
The orange-crested manakin's breeding season has not been defined but includes February in Peru. Males display in a "court", especially with an elaborate upward spiral flight with a flat circular pattern at its apex. The one known nest was a shallow cup made from plant fibers attached to a branch fork with spider web. It was about 4 m (13 ft) above a small stream and contained two eggs. The incubation period, time to fledging, and details of parental care are not known.

=== Vocal and non-vocal sounds ===
The orange-crested manakin's song is "a rising-falling-rising, tinkling chatter: TEE'ee'ee'u'u'ee'ee'uu" and its call "a squeaky chatter". Its displays, both aerial and terrestrial, end with a mechanically produced "pop".

== Status ==
The IUCN has assessed the flame-crested manakin as being of Least Concern. It has a large range; its population size is not known and is believed to be decreasing. No immediate threats have been identified. It is considered "scarce and local" in Ecuador, "fairly common, but very local" in Peru, and rare in Brazil.
