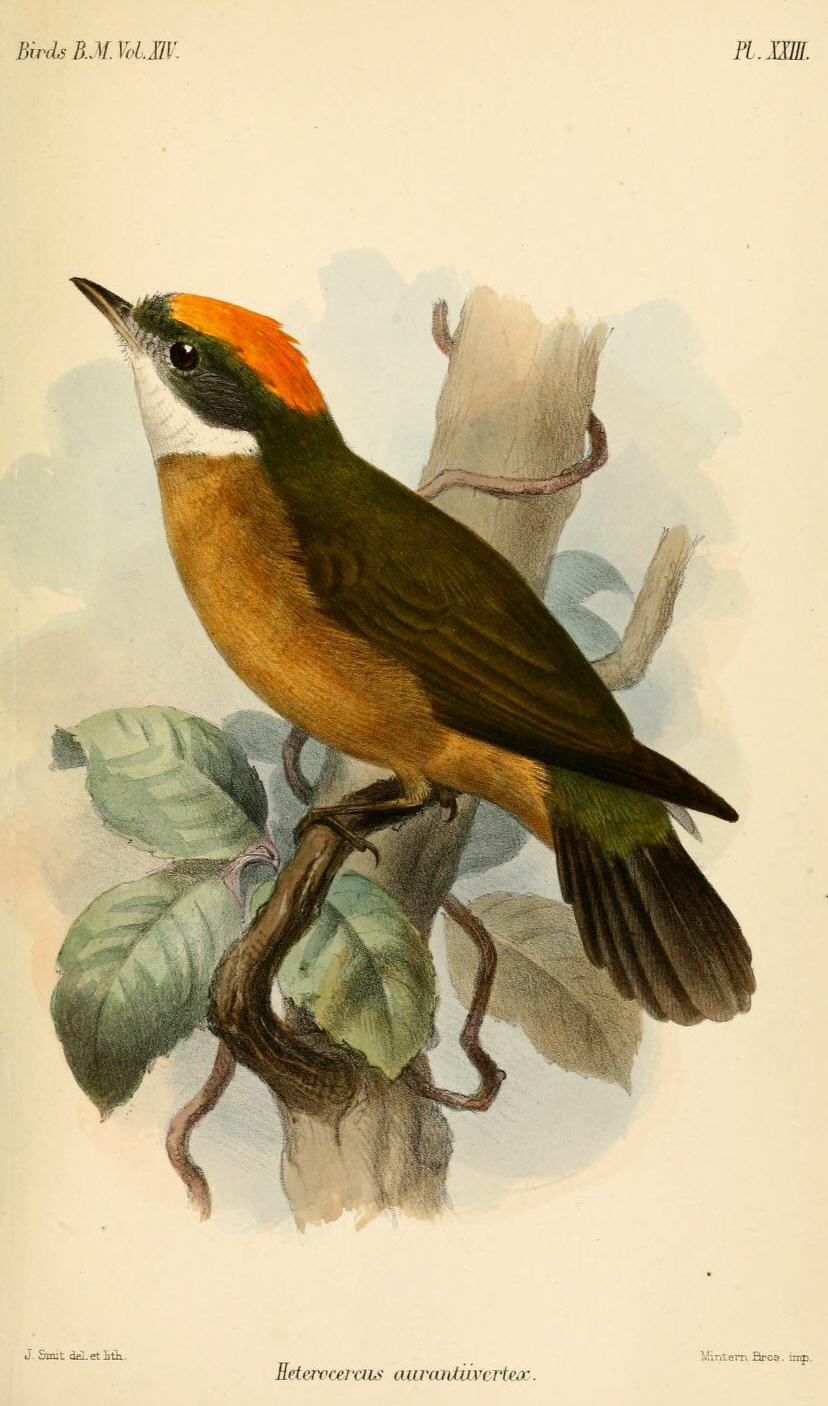
- Orange-crested manakin (Heterocercus aurantiivertex)

Scientific classification
- Kingdom: Animalia
- Phylum: Chordata
- Class: Aves
- Order: Passeriformes
- Family: Pipridae
- Genus: Heterocercus; P.L. Sclater, 1862

Type species
- Elaenia linteata Strickland, 1850

= Heterocercus =

Genus of birds

Heterocercus is a genus of bird in the family Pipridae. Established by Philip Lutley Sclater in 1862, it contains the following species:

Image	Scientific name	Common name	Distribution
	Heterocercus aurantiivertex	Orange-crested manakin	Ecuador and Peru
	Heterocercus flavivertex	Yellow-crested manakin	Northern Amazonia
	Heterocercus linteatus	Flame-crested manakin	Bolivia, Brazil, and Peru

The name Heterocercus is a combination of the Greek words heteros, meaning "different" and kerkos, meaning "tail".
