= Kilham =

Kilham can refer to:

== Places in England ==
- Kilham, East Riding of Yorkshire, a village
- Kilham, Northumberland, a village

== Plants ==
- Rosa 'Charles P. Kilham', an orange-red hybrid tea rose

== People ==
- Alexander Kilham (1762–1798), English Methodist minister
- Chris Kilham (born 1952), researcher of plant-based medicines
- George Kilham (1916–1978), Australian rugby league footballer
- Hannah Kilham (1774–1832), Methodist and Quaker, wife of Alexander Kilham, known as a missionary and linguist
- Lawrence Kilham (1910–2000), American virologist and nature writer
- Susan Kilham (1943—2022), American ecologist
- Walter Harrington Kilham (1868–1948), American architect
- Ben Kilham
