= John Burroughs Medal =

Award for book authors

The John Burroughs Medal, named for nature writer John Burroughs (1837–1921), is awarded each year in April by the John Burroughs Association to the author of a book that the association has judged to be distinguished in the field of natural history. Only twice has the award been given to a work of fiction.

== List of recipients of the John Burroughs Medal ==
- 1926 - William Beebe, Pheasants of the World
- 1927 - Ernest Thompson Seton, Lives of Game Animals
- 1928 - John Russell McCarthy, Nature Poems
- 1929 - Frank M. Chapman, Handbook of Birds of Eastern North America (published 1906)
- 1930 - Archibald Rutledge, Peace in the Heart
- 1931 - no award
- 1932 - Frederick S. Dellenbaugh, A Canyon Voyage: A Narrative of the Second Powell Expedition, ISBN 0-8165-0880-1
- 1933 - Oliver P. Medsger, Spring, Summer, Fall, Winter (set)
- 1934 - W.W. Christman, Wild Pasture Pine
- 1935 - no award
- 1936 - Charles Crawford Gorst, Recordings of Bird Calls
- 1937 - no award
- 1938 - Robert Cushman Murphy, Oceanic Birds of South America
- 1939 - T. Gilbert Pearson, Adventures in Bird Protection
- 1940 - Arthur Cleveland Bent, Life Histories of North American Birds (18 title series, United States Government Printing Office)
- 1941 - Louis J. Halle, Jr., Birds Against Men
- 1942 - Edward A. Armstrong, Birds of the Grey Wind
- 1943 - Edwin Way Teale, Near Horizons: The Story of an Insect Garden
- 1944 - no award
- 1945 - Rutherford Platt, This Green World ISBN 0-396-09188-1
- 1946 - Florence Page Jaques and Francis Lee Jaques (illustrator), Snowshoe Country, ISBN 0-87351-236-7
- 1947 - no award
- 1948 - Theodora Stanwell-Fletcher, Driftwood Valley, ISBN 0-87071-524-0
- 1949 - Helen G. Cruickshank, Flight Into Sunshine: Bird Experiences in Florida
- 1950 - Roger Tory Peterson, Birds Over America, ISBN 0-396-08269-6
- 1951 - no award
- 1952 - Rachel Carson, The Sea Around Us, ISBN 0-451-61873-4
- 1953 - Gilbert Klingel, The Bay, ISBN 0-8018-2536-9
- 1954 - Joseph Wood Krutch, The Desert Year, ISBN 0-8165-0923-9
- 1955 - Wallace Byron Grange and Olaus J. Murie (illustrator), Those of the Forest, ISBN 1-55971-083-7
- 1956 - Guy Murchie, Song of the Sky
- 1957 - Archie Fairly Carr, The Windward Road: Adventures of a Naturalist on Remote Caribbean Shores, ISBN 0-8130-0639-2
- 1958 - Robert Porter Allen, On the Trail of the Vanishing Birds
- 1959 - no award
- 1960 - John Kieran, A Natural History of New York City, ISBN 0-8232-1086-3
- 1961 - Loren Eiseley, The Firmament of Time, ISBN 0-8032-6739-8
- 1962 - George Miksch Sutton, Iceland Summer: Adventures of a Bird Painter, ISBN 0-8061-0491-0
- 1963 - Adolph Murie, A Naturalist in Alaska, ISBN 0-8165-1168-3
- 1964 - John Hay, The Great Beach: A Naturalist Explores the Frontier Between Land and Sea on the Outer Reaches of Cape Cod, ISBN 0-345-02255-6
- 1965 - Paul Brooks, Roadless Area, ISBN 0-345-25276-4
- 1966 - Louis Darling, The Gull's Way, ISBN 0-688-21366-9
- 1967 - Charlton Ogburn, Jr., The Winter Beach, ISBN 0-688-09418-X
- 1968 - Hal Borland, Hill Country Harvest
- 1969 - Louise de Kiriline Lawrence, The Lovely and the Wild, ISBN 0-920474-43-8
- 1970 - Victor B. Scheffer, The Year of the Whale
- 1971 - John K. Terres, From Laurel Hill to Siler's Bog, ISBN 0-8078-4426-8
- 1972 - Robert S. Arbib, The Lord's Woods: The Passing of an American Woodland, ISBN 0-393-08639-9
- 1973 - Elizabeth Barlow, The Forests and Wetlands of New York City
- 1974 - Sigurd F. Olson, Wilderness Days, ISBN 0-394-47155-5
- 1975 - no award
- 1976 - Ann Haymond Zwinger, Run, River, Run, ISBN 0-06-014824-1
- 1977 - Aldo Leopold, A Sand County Almanac, ISBN 0-915024-15-2
- 1978 - Ruth Kirk, The American Southwest Desert, ISBN 0-395-17209-8
- 1979 - Barry Lopez, Of Wolves and Men, ISBN 0-7432-4936-4
- 1980 - no award
- 1981 - Mary Durant and Michael Harwood, On the Road with John James Audubon, ISBN 0-396-07740-4
- 1982 - Peter Matthiessen, Sand Rivers, ISBN 0-906053-22-6
- 1983 - Alexander F. Skutch, A Naturalist on a Tropical Farm, ISBN 0-520-03802-9
- 1984 - David Rains Wallace, The Klamath Knot: Explorations of Myth and Evolution, ISBN 0-520-23659-9
- 1985 - Mark Owens and Delia Owens, Cry of the Kalahari, ISBN 0-395-64780-0
- 1986 - Gary Paul Nabhan, Gathering the Desert, ISBN 0-8165-0935-2
- 1987 - Robert Michael Pyle, Wintergreen: Rambles in a Ravaged Land, ISBN 0-684-18321-8
- 1988 - Tom Horton and Charles R. Hazard (illustrator), Bay Country, ISBN 0-8018-3525-9
- 1989 - Lawrence Kilham, On Watching Birds, ISBN 0-930031-14-8
- 1990 - John McPhee, The Control of Nature, ISBN 0-374-12890-1
- 1991 - Richard Nelson, The Island Within, ISBN 0-86547-404-4
- 1992 - Kenneth S. Norris, Dolphin Days: The Life and Times of the Spinner Dolphin, ISBN 0-393-02945-X
- 1993 - Vincent Dethier, Crickets and Katydids, Concerts and Solos, ISBN 0-674-17577-8
- 1994 - David G. Campbell, The Crystal Desert: Summers in Antarctica, ISBN 0-436-20049-X
- 1995 - Craig Packer, Into Africa, ISBN 0-226-64429-4
- 1996 - Bill Green, Water, Ice and Stone:Science and Memory on the Antarctic Lakes, ISBN 0-517-58759-9
- 1997 - David Quammen, The Song Of The Dodo: Island Biogeography in an Age of Extinction, ISBN 0-684-80083-7
- 1998 - John Alcock, In a Desert Garden:Love and Death Among the Insects, ISBN 0-8165-1970-6
- 1999 - Jan DeBlieu, Wind: How the Flow of Air Has Shaped Life, Myth, and the Land, ISBN 0-395-78033-0
- 2000 - Bernd Heinrich, Mind Of the Raven, ISBN 0-06-017447-1
- 2001 - David M. Carroll, Swampwalker's Journal, ISBN 0-395-64725-8
- 2002 - Ken Lamberton, Wilderness and Razor Wire, ISBN 1-56279-116-8
- 2003 - Carl Safina, Eye of the Albatross: Visions of Hope and Survival, ISBN 0-8050-6228-9
- 2004 - Ted Levin, Liquid Land: A Journey Through The Florida Everglades, ISBN 0-8203-2512-0
- 2005 - Robin Wall Kimmerer, Gathering Moss: A Natural and Cultural History of Mosses, ISBN 0-87071-499-6
- 2006 - Donald Kroodsma, The Singing Life of Birds, ISBN 0-618-40568-2
- 2007 - Ellen Meloy, Eating Stone: Imagination And The Loss Of The Wild, ISBN 0-375-42216-1
- 2008 - Julia Whitty, The Fragile Edge: Diving and Other Adventures in the South Pacific, ISBN 0-618-19716-8
- 2009 - Franklin Burroughs, Confluence: Merrymeeting Bay, ISBN 0-88448-282-0
- 2010 - Michael Welland, Sand: The Never-Ending Story, ISBN 0-520-26597-1
- 2011 - Elisabeth Tova Bailey, The Sound of a Wild Snail Eating, ISBN 978-1565126060
- 2012 - Edward (Ted) Hoagland, Sex and the River Styx, ISBN 978-1603583374
- 2013 - Thor Hanson, Feathers: The Evolution of a Natural Miracle, ISBN 978-0465028788
- 2014 - Kathleen Jamie, Sightlines, ISBN 978-0956308665
- 2015 - Sherry Simpson, Dominion of Bears, ISBN 978-0700619351
- 2016 - Sharman Apt Russell, Diary of a Citizen Scientist, ISBN 978-0870717529
- 2017 - Brian Doyle, Martin Marten, ISBN 978-1250045201
- 2018 - David George Haskell, The Songs of Trees, ISBN 978-0525427520; a special John Burroughs Medal was given for Lifetime Achievement in Nature Poetry to Pattiann Rogers
- 2020 - Marilyn Sigman, Entangled: People and Ecological Change in Alaska's Kachemak Bay, ISBN 978-1602233485
- 2021 - William Bryant Logan, Sprout Lands: Tending the Endless Gift of Trees, W. W. Norton & Company, 2020
- 2022 - Cal Flyn, Islands of Abandonment: Nature Rebounding in the Post-Human Landscape.
- 2023 - Kelby Ouchley, Bayou D’Arbonne Swamp: A Naturalist’s Memoir of Place, Louisiana State University Press.
- 2024 - Marina Richie, Halcyon Journey: A Search for the Belted Kingfisher, Oregon State University Press, 2022.
- 2025 - Marcia Bjornerud, Turning to Stone: Discovering the Subtle Wisdom of Rocks, ISBN 9781472298454
