= Stanwell (disambiguation) =

Stanwell is a village in England.

Stanwell may also refer to:

== Places ==
- Stanwell, Queensland, a town in Australia
- Stanwell (Penarth electoral ward), an electoral ward in the Vale of Glamorgan, Wales
- Stanwell-Fletcher Lake, in the Canadian Arctic
- Stanwell Moor, west of Stanwell, Surrey
- Stanwell Park, New South Wales
- Stanwell Tops, New South Wales

== Other ==
- Stanwell Power Station, Stanwell, Queensland
- Stanwell Corporation, and electricity provider in Queensland
- Stanwell School, Penarth, Wales
- Stanwell Place, a house in Middlesex, England
- Theodora Stanwell-Fletcher (1906–2000), American naturalist and writer
