= Franklin Burroughs =

Franklin Burroughs may refer to:

- Franklin Burroughs (businessman) (1834–1897), American entrepreneur who co-founded the Burroughs and Collins company
- Franklin Burroughs (author), American author of non-fiction
