= Helen G. Cruickshank =

American writer, photographer

Helen Cruickshank (née Gere; February 20, 1902 – March 31, 1994) was an American nature writer and photographer of birds in their natural habitats in many areas of the world.

In 1937, she married Allan D. Cruickshank, a lecturer, writer, and photographer for the Audubon Society. Husband and wife formed a highly effective partnership for photography and bird study. He took the black and white photos and she took the color slides on their bird study expeditions.

The Academy of Natural Sciences of Drexel University (formerly named the Philadelphia Academy of Natural Science) has a bird image collection named VIREO (Visual REsource For Ornithology) with over 180,000 thousand photographs, thousands of which were taken by the Cruickshanks.

Helen Cruickshank won the 1949 John Burroughs Medal for her 1948 book, Flight into Sunshine: Bird Experiences in Florida. Brevard County, Florida established the Helen and Allan Cruickshank Sanctuary, a 140-acre wildlife refuge near Rockledge, Florida. The Florida Ornithological Society sponsors the Helen G. and Allan D. Cruickshank Education Award.

== Books ==
- Bird islands down East. New York: Macmillan Co. 1941; photographs by Allan D. Cruickshank
- Flight into sunshine, bird experiences in Florida. New York: Macmillan Co. 1948; photographs by Allan D. Cruickshank
- Water birds. Garden City, N.Y.: N. Doubleday. 1955.
- Wonders of the bird world. New York: Dodd, Mead & Co. 1956; photographs by Allan D. Cruickshank
- as editor: John and William Bartram's America: selections from the writings of the Philadelphia naturalists. 1957; edited with an introduction by Helen Gere Cruickshank; foreword by B. Bartram Cadbury; illustrated by Francis Lee Jacques
- with Allan D. Cruickshank: 1001 questions answered about birds. New York: Dodd, Mead & Co. 1958; photographs by Allan D. Cruickshank; drawings by James Macdonald Cruickshank, Allan D.; Cruickshank, Helen Gere (January 1976). 1976 Dover reprint. Courier Corporation. ISBN 9780486233154.
- Wonders of the reptile world. New York: Dodd, Mead & Co. 1959; illustrations by Lon Ellis
- Fun with birds in Florida. Florida Federation of Garden Clubs. 1960.
- as editor: Thoreau on birds. New York: McGraw-Hill. 1964; Henry David Thoreau's writings on birds, compiled and with commentary by Helen Cruickshank; foreword by Roger Tory Peterson
- Paradise of birds: when spring comes to Texas. New York: Dodd, Mead & Co. 1968; photographers by Allan D. Cruickshank
- as editor: Nesting season: the bird photographs of Frederick Kent Truslow. New York: Viking Press. 1979. ISBN 978-0-670-50606-4; commentary by Helen G. Cruickshank; foreword by Olin Sewall Pettingill, Jr.; afterword by Mildred McCutcheon Truslow
- as editor: The birds of Brevard County, Florida (compilation of the sighting records by Allan Cruickshank in Brevard County). Orlando, Florida: Florida Press. 1980; with added records (1974–1978) by Robert D. Barber
