= Feathers: The Evolution of a Natural Miracle =

Book by Thor Hanson

- Cover art
- Author: Thor Hanson
- Subject: Evolutionary biology
- Genre: Non-fiction
- Published: 2011 (Basic Books)
- Publication place: United States
- Pages: 336
- Awards: John Burroughs Medal; Pacific Northwest Booksellers Association Award
- ISBN: 978-0-465-02013-3
- Website: thorhanson.net/feathers.html

Feathers: The Evolution of a Natural Miracle is a natural history book by American conservation biologist Thor Hanson. Published by Basic Books in 2011 and written for general audiences, the book discusses the significance of feathers, their evolution, and their history both in nature and in use by humans.

Feathers is divided into five parts. In "Evolution", Hanson discusses the scientific debate over how feathers evolved, interviewing ornithologists Richard Prum and Alan Feduccia, as well as paleontologist Xing Xu. In "Fluff", Hanson discusses how feathers play a role in regulating a bird's body temperature and how feather insulation has also been utilized by humans. "Flight" discusses how flight might have evolved in birds, interviewing Prum, Feduccia, Xu, and also ornithologist Ken Dial, who described wing-assisted incline running. In "Fancy", Hanson discusses the role of feathers in sexual selection, as well as how humans have utilized feathers for fashion, interviewing costume and fashion designers on the Las Vegas Strip and New York City. "Function" discusses how feathers have been adapted for other purposes, such as waterproofing, fly fishing, and quill pens.

Hanson decided he would write Feathers after going on a run and noticing a feather dropped at his feet by a vulture; coincidentally, he had considered writing a story involving vulture feathers earlier that day. The book was published first in hardcover by Basic Books in 2011, then in paperback in 2012. Critical reception to Feathers has predominantly been positive, with praise for Hanson's enthusiasm and writing. In 2012, Feathers won the Pacific Northwest Booksellers Association Award and the SB&F Prize in the Young Adult Science Book category, presented by the American Association for the Advancement of Science and Subaru. In 2013, the book was also awarded the John Burroughs Medal.

== Background and publication ==
Thor Hanson is a researcher with a variety of interests. In addition to writing for general audiences, his published research includes the impact of forest fragmentation on bird nest predation, the impact of human warfare on conservation policy, the behavior of Neotropical monkeys and birds, and others. Hanson received a Ph.D. from the University of Idaho in 2006; for his dissertation, he studied the impact of habitat fragmentation on the ecology of a type of tropical tree.

Hanson's interest in feathers began after observing vultures in Kenya. According to Hanson, when brainstorming ideas for a new book, he considered a story which involved vultures and their feathers, and later that day, as he went on a run, he noticed four turkey vultures keeping watch over a roadkill deer. One of the vultures began flapping and dropped a feather at Hanson's feet. Moved by this coincidence, Hanson decided then to write a book about feathers. Basic Books first published Feathers in hardcover in 2011. In 2012, Basic Books published it in paperback as well, and the book has also been published as an ebook and audiobook. An essay-length adaptation titled "The Multiple Miracles of Bird Feathers" appeared in the January–February 2012 edition of Audubon, published by the National Audubon Society. Feathers is Hanson's second book, after The Impenetrable Forest: My Gorilla Years in Uganda (2008).

== Content summary ==
Following a preface and introduction, Feathers is divided into five main parts: "Evolution" discusses the evolutionary history of feathers, "Fluff" explains the role of feathers in regulating body temperature, "Flight" discusses the origin of avian flight as well as its impact on human aviation, "Fancy" discusses the role of feathers in sexual selection and human fashion, and "Function" discusses the continuing evolution of feathers in both nature and human usage.

=== Evolution ===
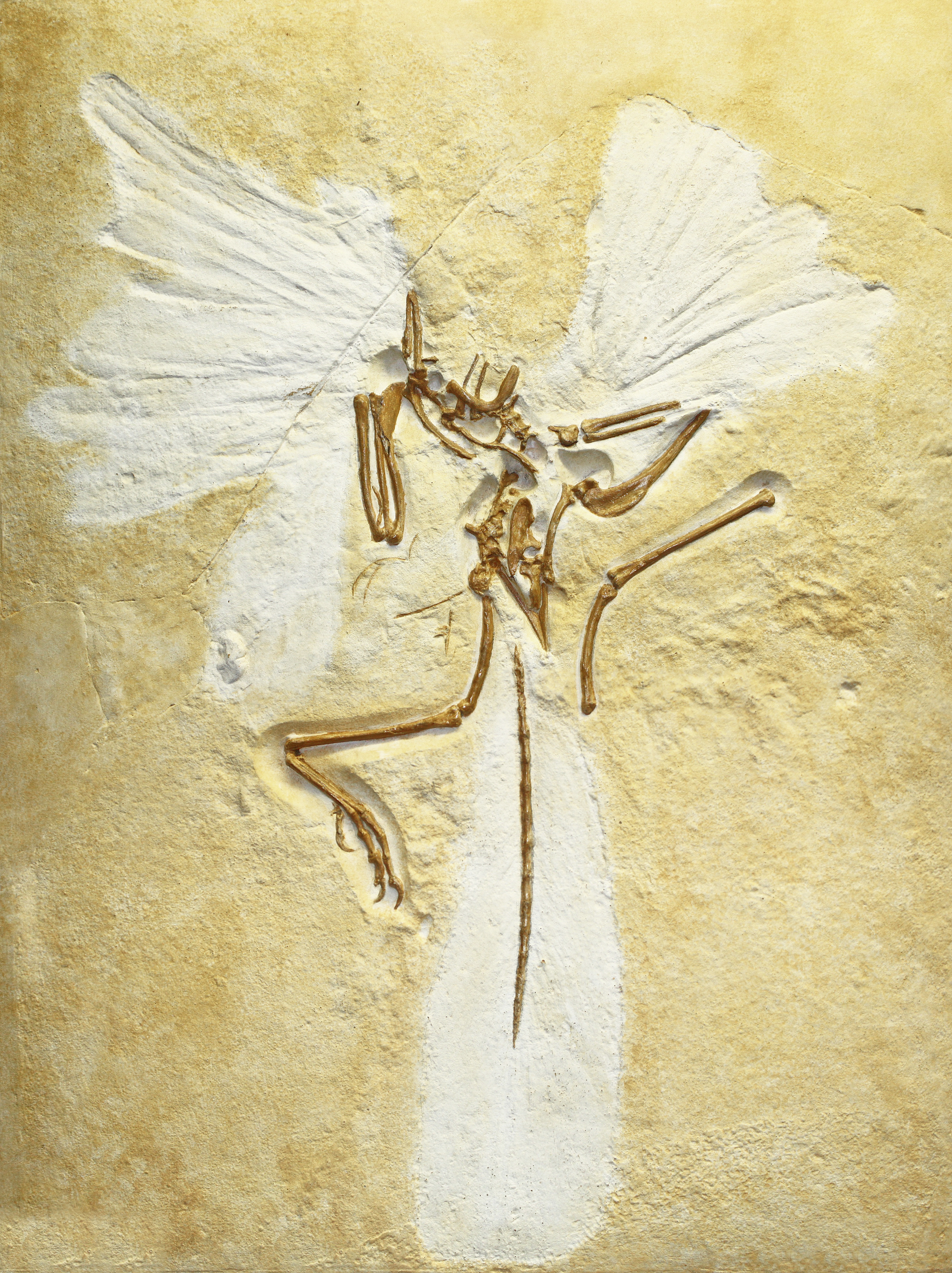
A replica of the London specimen, the Archaeopteryx specimen which Hanson first discusses in Feathers

Feathers begins with the 1861 discovery of the first Archaeopteryx fossil specimen and the resulting debate between English paleontologist Richard Owen, an opponent to evolution by natural selection, and Thomas Henry Huxley, an advocate for evolution. Hanson himself visits the Wyoming Dinosaur Center, a small museum in Thermopolis, Wyoming, which had acquired an Archaeopteryx specimen. Hanson interviews Richard Prum, the Coe Professor of Ornithology at Yale University, who proposed a developmental theory of feather evolution, which focuses "on how feathers grow and not worrying about what they're used for." Hanson also interviews Alan Feduccia, a professor at the University of North Carolina, who disagrees with the scientific consensus that birds evolved from theropod dinosaurs. Later, Hanson interviews Xing Xu, a Chinese paleontologist who described fossil specimens that helped support Prum's developmental theory, such as Beipiaosaurus and Microraptor. Hanson also discusses the development of feathers in thin-billed prions, as well as how feather growth is controlled by the Sonic hedgehog gene.

=== Fluff ===
In "Fluff", Hanson describes his experience at Winter Ecology, a "hands-on exploration of cold-weather ecosystems" organized by Bernd Heinrich, a biologist at the University of Vermont. While staying in a log cabin in a remote location in western Maine, Hanson observed how golden-crowned kinglets and other birds were able to keep warm on nights when the temperature was −17 °F (−27 °C) and discusses the role of feathers in maintaining a comfortable body temperature for birds. To understand how down feathers have been adapted for human purposes, Hanson interviews Travis Stier at the Pacific Coast Feather Company, which manufactures pillows and comforters made with feathers. Later, Hanson discusses various strategies that birds employ to keep cool in warmer climates and during periods of muscular activity, such as flight and fast running, as well as the role of feathers in these strategies.

=== Flight ===
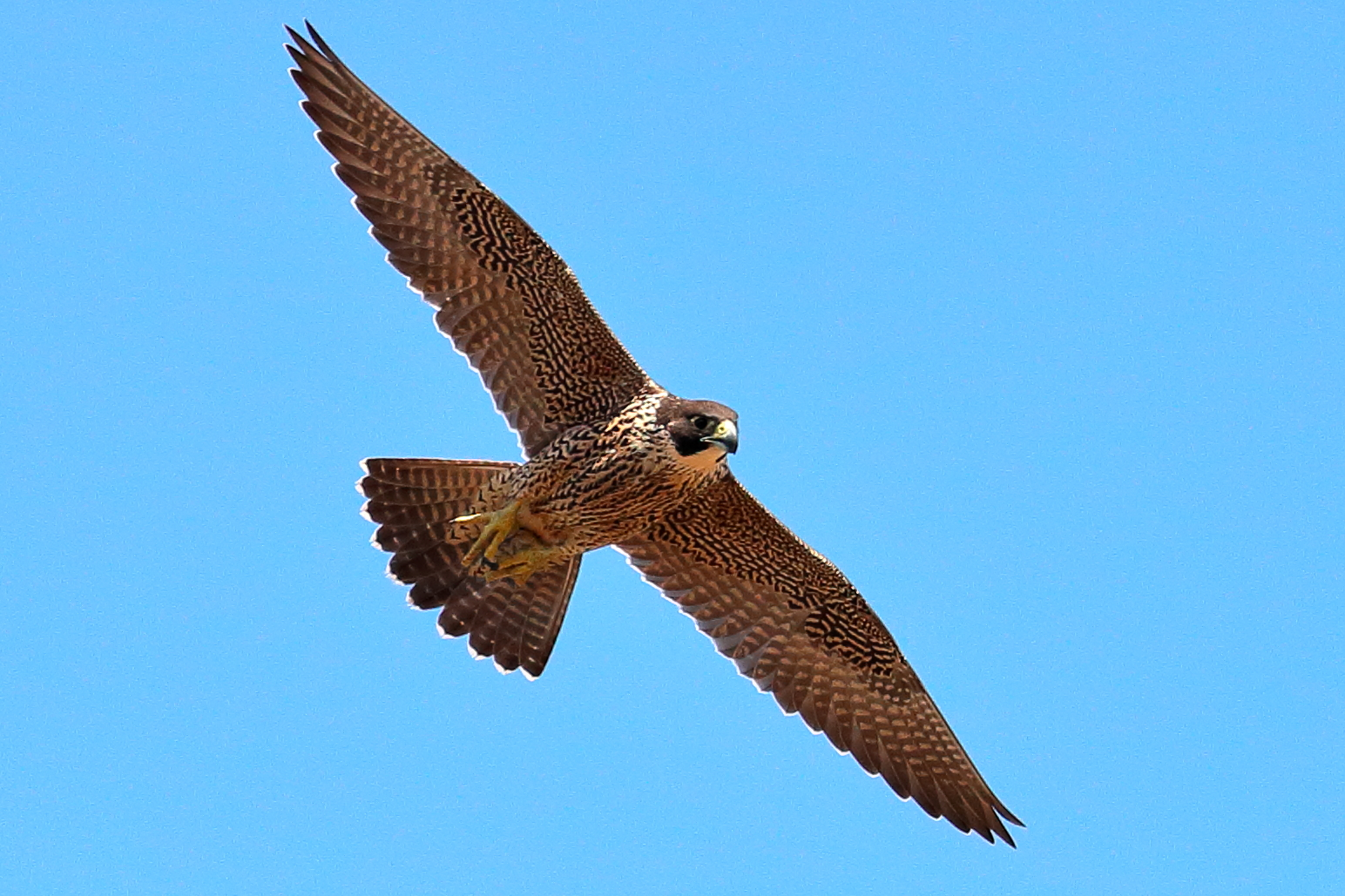
A peregrine falcon in flight. In Feathers, Hanson interviews the owner of a peregrine falcon whose dive was measured at 242 miles per hour (389 km/h), the fastest flying animal on record.

Scientists disagree on how feathered flight originally evolved, and Hanson describes various viewpoints on the subject. The "ground-up" view holds that flight originated from theropod dinosaurs running along the ground, whereas the "tree-down" view holds that flight originated from animals who lived in trees "as a means to extend their hops from branch to branch". Hanson discusses the issue with Feduccia, who argues for the "tree-down" view, noting that other vertebrates also developed flight from the tree down. Hanson also discusses with Prum and Xu, who state that while the origin of feathers might have been ground-based theropods, the origin of flight could have been theropods who climbed trees, especially considering four-winged feathered theropods like Microraptor. Hanson interviews Ken Dial, an ornithologist who described wing-assisted incline running (WAIR), a behavior exhibited by baby birds learning how to fly. WAIR has been proposed as an alternative model for the origin of avian flight, as it addresses weaknesses in both the "ground-up" and "tree-down" views. Later, Hanson interviews Ken Franklin, who raised Frightful, a peregrine falcon whose dive was measured to be 242 miles per hour (389 km/h), making her the fastest flying animal on record. Franklin describes the role of feathers in improving the aerodynamics of a falcon's flight. Hanson concludes the "Flight" section with discussion of how feathered flight has influenced human aviation.

=== Fancy ===
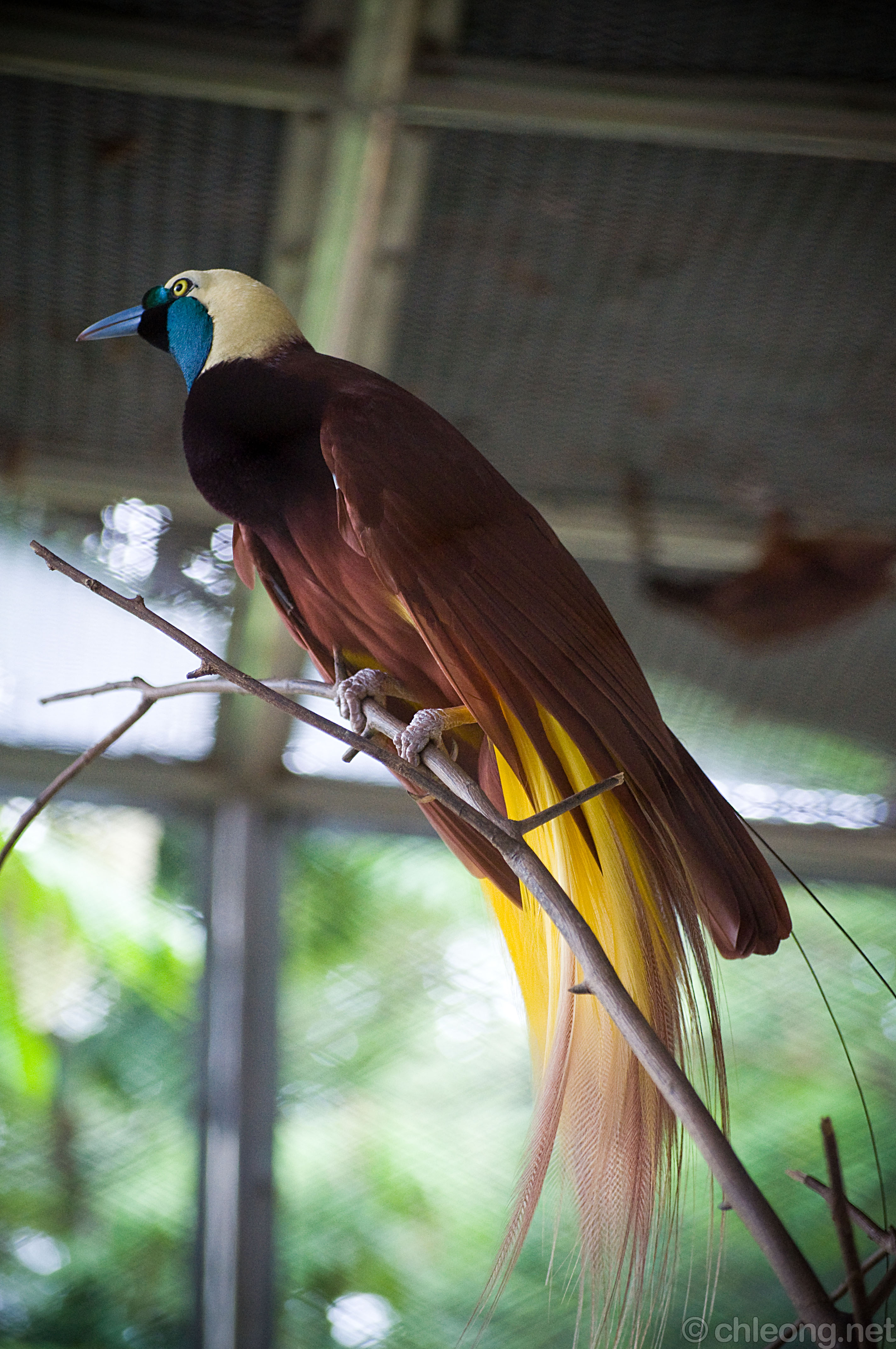
When discussing the work of Alfred Russel Wallace, Hanson describes the brilliantly colored feathers of the male greater bird-of-paradise, photographed here in 2008.

Hanson describes the behavior of birds-of-paradise and the role of their elaborate feathers in sexual selection. Hanson also visits the Las Vegas Strip and observes how feathers play a role in pageant shows like Jubilee!. Hanson interviews Marios Ignadiou, the head of Jubilee!'s costume shop, as well as fashion designer Pete Menefree. Hanson then describes the history of the feather trade in fashion. In the period before World War I, feathers were highly valuable commodities. Wanting to capitalize on the economic strength of feathers, the government of South Africa sponsored the Trans-Saharan Ostrich Expedition, led by Russel William Thornton to find the Barbary ostrich. After much adversity, Thornton and his crew returned to South Africa in 1912 with 127 surviving Barbary ostriches. Unfortunately, demand for feathers in fashion decreased dramatically a few years later, once more women entered the workforce for the war effort. Hanson later interviews Leah Chalfen, a hat designer based in New York City who specializes in feathers. Hanson also interviews Jodi Favazzo, the owner of the Rainbow Feather Company, which dyes feathers.

=== Function ===
Hanson rescues a grounded common murre by carrying it back to the ocean (takeoff is extremely difficult for murres if they are not on water). He then explains how the structure of feathers is waterproofing, keeping birds dry in wet conditions. Hanson interviews John Sullivan, an experienced fly fisher who explains the role of feathers in fly fishing. Later, Hanson explains the history and use of feathers in quill pens, which he uses as an example of how feathers have been adapted for other purposes beyond their natural evolutionary purposes. Hanson also describes his experience observing the behavior of vultures in Kenya, in which he discusses the lack of feathers on the heads of vultures. Hanson interviews Kimberly Bostwick, an ornithologist and curator at Cornell University Museum of Vertebrates, who discusses her research in the club-winged manakin, a bird whose feathers enable it to make sounds with its wings. In the National Museum of Natural History, Hanson interviews Carla Dove, who works in the museum's Feather Identification Lab, which identifies the species of bird which a feather originates from.

== Awards ==
In 2012, Feathers received the Pacific Northwest Booksellers Association Award, an annual award which recognizes "excellence in writing" from five U.S. states in the Pacific Northwest. In the same year, Feathers also received the SB&F Prize in the Young Adult Science Book category, presented by the American Association for the Advancement of Science and Subaru. Feathers was listed among the top ten best books of 2011 in the Sci-Tech category by the Library Journal. Feathers received the John Burroughs Medal in 2013, which is awarded annually by the John Burroughs Association to "the author of a distinguished book of natural history".

== Reception ==
=== Academic ===
Frances C. James, in a review published in The Condor, described the book as "scholarly and enjoyable", commenting that "Hanson has worked hard to summarize the science behind our current understanding of the form and function of feathers, their development and their evolution." Regarding Hanson's description of the origin of feathers and flight, James commented that Hanson could have taken "an even more critical approach" by stating that "Prum's developmental model has not really been tested ... Confirmation of the predictions of a theory is not a test unless the predictions help discriminate among alternative hypotheses." James eventually concluded, "I don't blame Hanson for not having delved more deeply into this subject. I just wish that ornithologists would evaluate alternative theories on the full weight of their evidence and stop misquoting Huxley."

Pepper W. Trail wrote a review published in The Quarterly Review of Biology, commenting, "Hanson has a gift for narrative and is an engaging companion as he leads readers through sometimes complex material." Trail also commented, "There are, however, a few places where the author's zest for telling a good story led him astray." As an example, Trail observed that Hanson uses eight pages to discuss the Trans-Saharan Ostrich Expedition, but "less than four on the science of feather coloration, a field burgeoning with new discoveries." In a review published in The Wilson Journal of Ornithology, Kimberly S. Bostwick described Hanson's writing as "engaging", writing that there is "something for everyone to learn", from professional ornithologists to non-biologists. Bostwick warned scientific readers, however, that Feathers uses poetic license "to adapt some of the historical accounts a little to make them flow as stories" and that "Hanson uses a few analogies to explain some of the more complex biological phenomenon that are not entirely accurate."

=== Literary ===
Literary reception to Feathers has been positive. Amanda Katz, in a review published by The New York Times, wrote that because Feathers is a work of synthesis, bird enthusiasts will find the book's content already "familiar", but noted that "as synthesis goes, it is gracious, funny, persuasive and wide ranging." Peter Forbes, in a review published by The Guardian, stated that Hanson's "enthusiasm is infectious", particularly for a topic Forbes found "alluring". The Economist published a review which also described Hanson as having "infectious enthusiasm" and stated, "Mr Hanson's unpretentious style makes what is essentially an excellent scientific work into an enjoyable read for the ignorant and uninitiated." Irene Wanner, in a review published by The Seattle Times, highlighted Hanson's analogies, calling them "apt" and helping to "simplify complex concepts". Kirkus Reviews described Feathers as a "delightful ramble through the byways of evolution and the wonderful world of birds."

Scientific American published an online review of Feathers in their blog Tetrapod Zoology by Darren Naish. Naish commented that prior to Hanson's book, "it doesn’t seem that any one book has ever been devoted to feathers and feathers alone. ... Feathers is thus a rather significant book, and very nice it is too." Naish also stated that "Feathers is not the provincial view of someone only interested in ecology or conservation biology; on the contrary, this is a remarkably well-rounded review of the subject." In a review published in the news magazine Maclean's, Brian Bethune praised Hanson's storytelling, writing, "For all the intriguing science, what really livens up Hanson's passionate discussion of his 'natural miracle' are the stories he tells." Laurence A. Marschall, a physics professor at Gettysburg College, wrote in a review published in the magazine Natural History, "In sum, Feathers is an impressive blend of beauty, form, and function."
