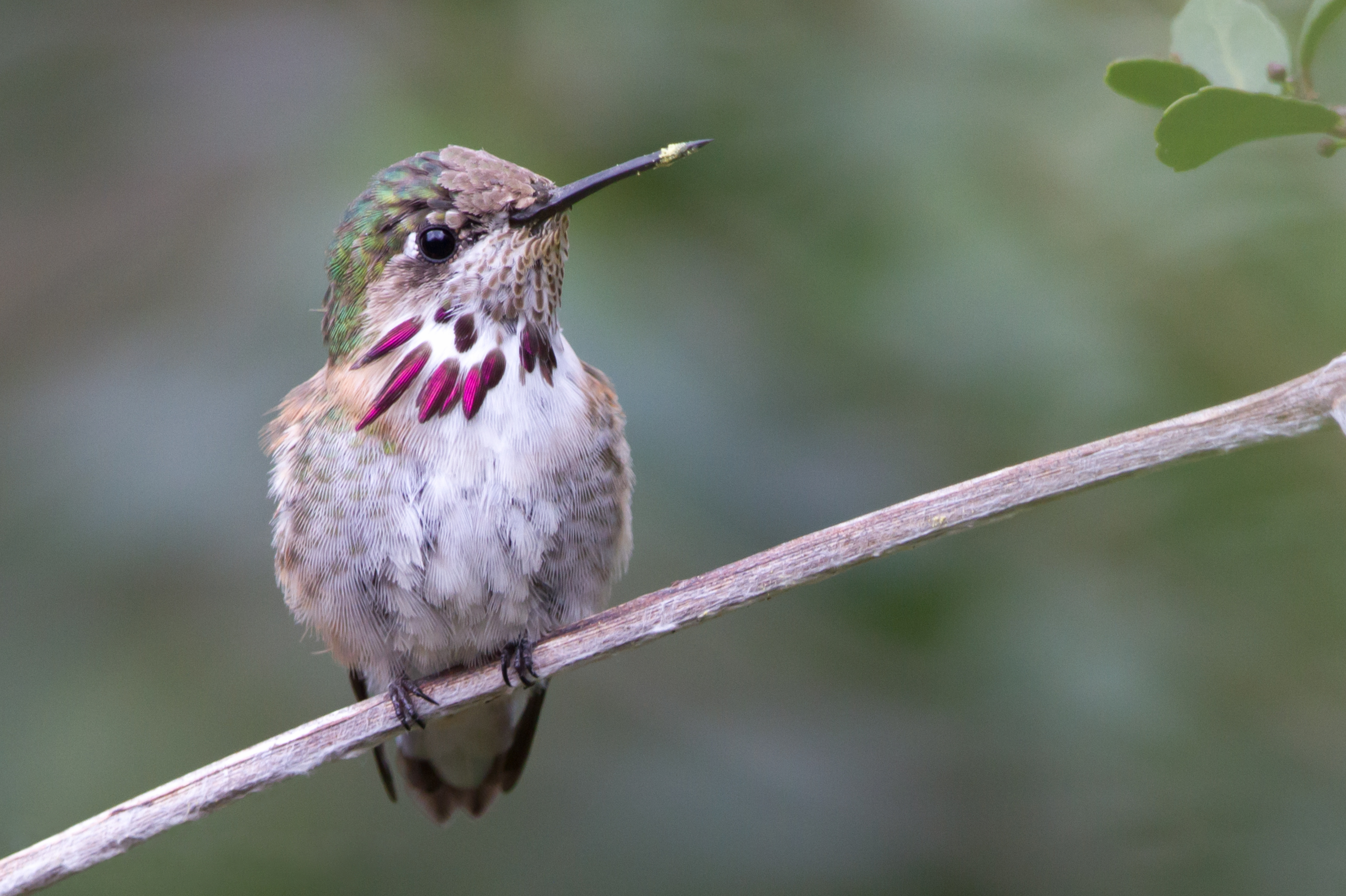

Conservation status
- Least Concern (IUCN 3.1)
- CITES Appendix II

Scientific classification
- Kingdom: Animalia
- Phylum: Chordata
- Class: Aves
- Order: Apodiformes
- Family: Trochilidae
- Genus: Selasphorus
- Species: S. calliope

Binomial name
- Selasphorus calliope (Gould, 1847)

Synonyms
- Stellula calliope

= Calliope hummingbird =

Smallest species of hummingbird in North America

The calliope hummingbird (/kəˈlaɪ.əpi/ kə-LY-ə-pee; Selasphorus calliope) is the smallest bird native to the United States and Canada. It has a western breeding range mainly from California to British Columbia, and migrates to the Southwestern United States, Mexico, and Central America for its wintering grounds. The calliope hummingbird is the smallest known long-distance bird migrant, completing migrations twice per year of some 9,000 km (5,600 mi).

It was previously considered the only member of the genus Stellula (meaning little star), but research evidence suggests its existing placement in the genus Selasphorus. The bird was named after the Greek muse Calliope.

== Description ==
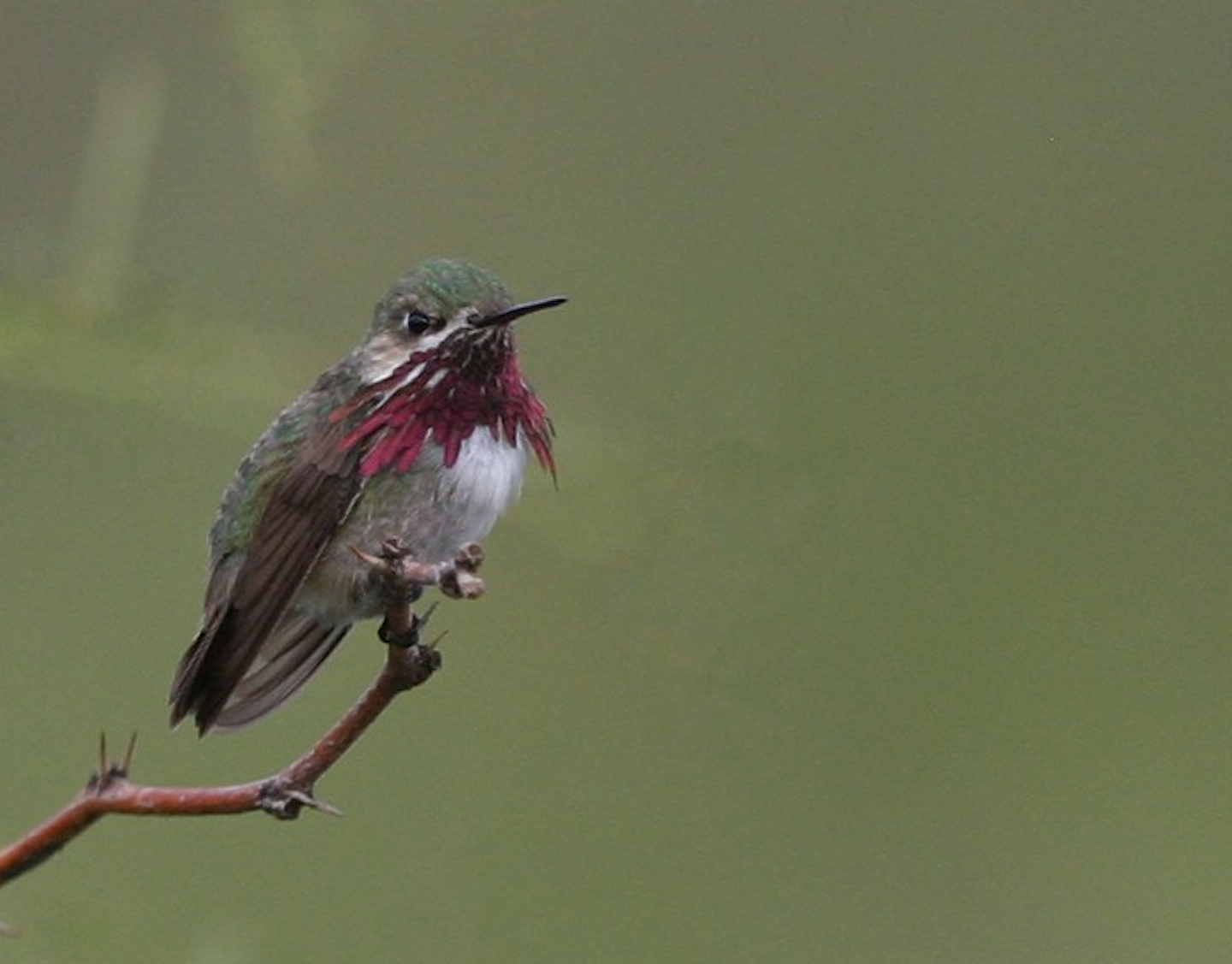
Male calliope hummingbird with its purple gorget (neck) feathers slightly extended

The calliope is the smallest breeding bird found in Canada and the United States. An adult calliope hummingbird can measure 7–10 cm (2.8–3.9 in) in length, span 11 cm (4.3 in) across the wings and weigh 2 to 3 g (0.071 to 0.106 oz).

Calliope hummingbirds have glossy green on the back and crown with white underparts. The adult male has wine-red streaks on the gorget, green flanks, and a dark tail. When an adult male is competing for territory or females, the dark red feathers of its gorget distend outwards to create a more distinct appearance. Females and immatures have a pinkish wash on the flanks, dark streaks on the throat and a dark tail with white tips. The only similar birds are the rufous hummingbird and the Allen's hummingbird, but these birds are larger with more distinct and contrasting rufous markings on the tail and flanks, and longer central tail feathers.

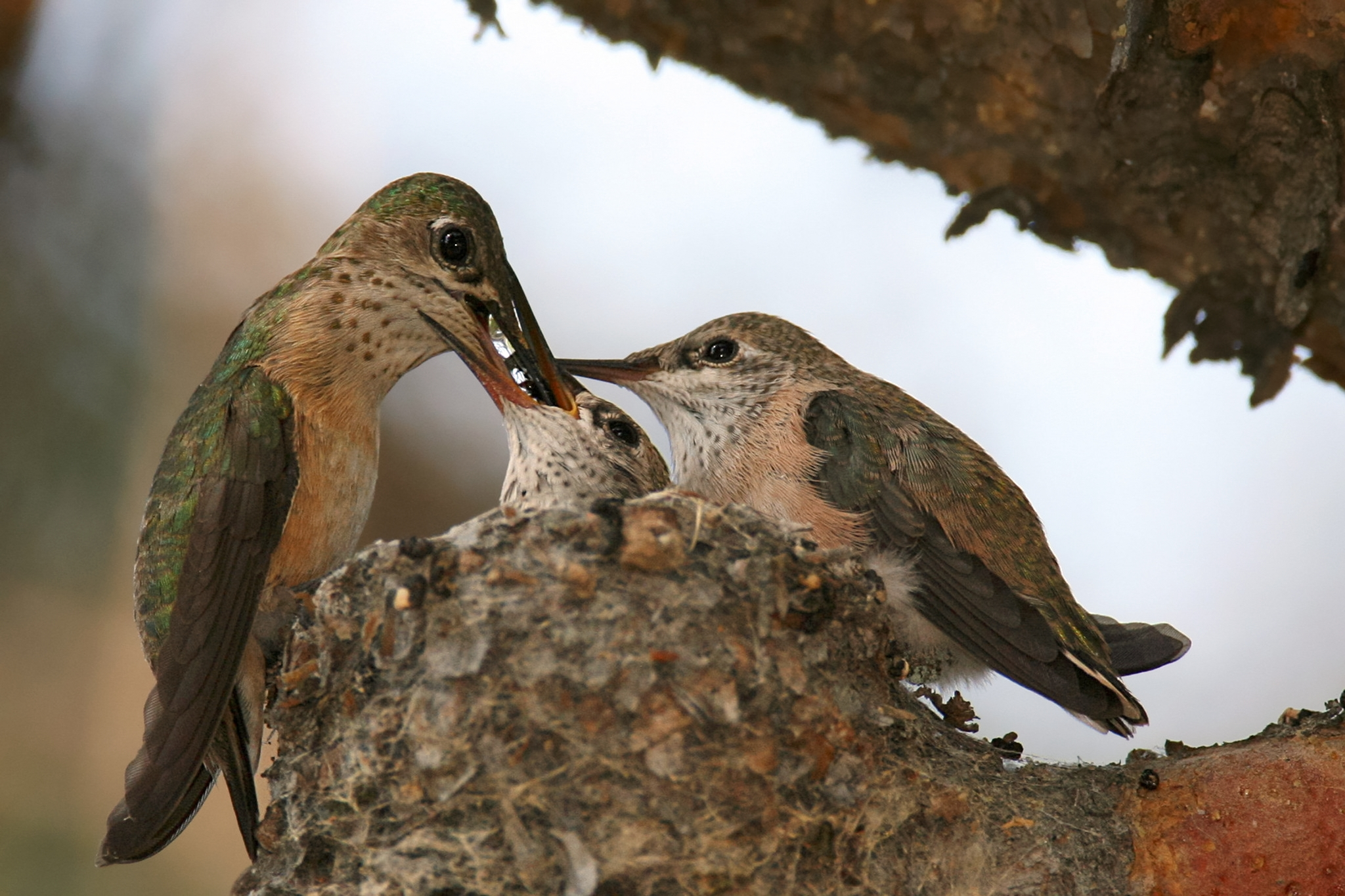
Female feeding insects to chicks

== Habitat and distribution ==
The breeding habitat of calliope hummingbird is varied among open shrub habitats and altitudes. Nesting usually occurs at higher altitudes in the Rocky Mountains. Nests have been observed from as low as 600 ft (180 m) in Oregon and Washington elevation to the tree line at over 11,000 ft (3,400 m). In Montana, the minimum elevation observed for breeding is 1,200 m (3,900 ft). Open montane forest, mountain meadows, and willow and alder thickets may variously serve as breeding grounds. During migration and winter, they also occur in chaparral, lowland brushy areas, deserts and semi-desert regions. They nest in western North America from southern British Columbia and Alberta south to Colorado and southern California. During winter, they move mainly through Arizona and New Mexico and northern Mexico, to winter in southwestern Mexico.

== Behavior ==
Calliope hummingbirds are a migratory bird, generally leaving their breeding grounds earlier than most birds (although not as early as the rufous hummingbird) to take advantage of the late-summer wildflowers in the mountains of western North America. They are believed to be the smallest-bodied long distance migrant in the world.

These birds feed on nectar from flowers using a long extendable tongue, drink sap from holes created by sapsuckers or catch insects on the wing. While collecting nectar, they also assist in plant pollination. Plants preferred for pollinating include paintbrush, penstemon, columbine, trumpet gilia, and elephant head. They will also occasionally catch and eat small insects and spiders.

Adult males usually arrive on the breeding ground before females, from mid-April to early May. The male claims and vigorously defends a nesting territory in which he will breed with many females. The male takes no part in raising the young and often actually vacates the breeding grounds by the time the young hatch. The female usually builds an open cup nest in a conifer tree under an overhanging branch, though apple and alder trees have also been used. The nest is often built on the base of large pine cones and somewhat resembles a pine cone itself. A nest may be used repeatedly over the course of several years. Two eggs are laid from late May to early July and are incubated for 15 to 16 days. The young are capable of flight about 20 days after hatching.

A group of three calliope hummingbirds hovering at a feeder to create the "humming" sound from their rapid wingbeats, while chirping by vocalization

=== Humming ===
The prominent humming sound of a calliope hummingbird – as for all hummingbirds during flight and hovering – derives from its rapid wingbeats while feeding or interacting with other hummingbirds. Humming serves as an audible communication to alert other birds of the arrival of a fellow forager or potential mate. The humming sound derives from aerodynamic forces generated by both the downstrokes and upstrokes of the rapid wingbeats, producing acoustic oscillations and harmonics.

=== Courtship display and sonation ===
During courtship, a male calliope hummingbird hovers at accelerated wingbeat frequency up to 95 flaps per second (42% higher than normal hovering), creating a loud buzzing sound, with throat feathers protruding and facing a female. The male then ascends temporarily to 20 m (66 ft) and dives at high speed, with the rapid descent causing sonation of wing and tail feathers combined with vocalization, intending to attract attention of the female. Research in a wind tunnel demonstrated that the male courtship display includes sounds produced by three independent feather or vocal components, each with different acoustic characteristics, thus potentially containing different messages appealing to the female. The tail feathers flutter at high frequency and hit each other to produce the buzzing sound. Male calliope hummingbirds also make visual displays to females and nearby males by extending their purple gorget feathers to appear larger.

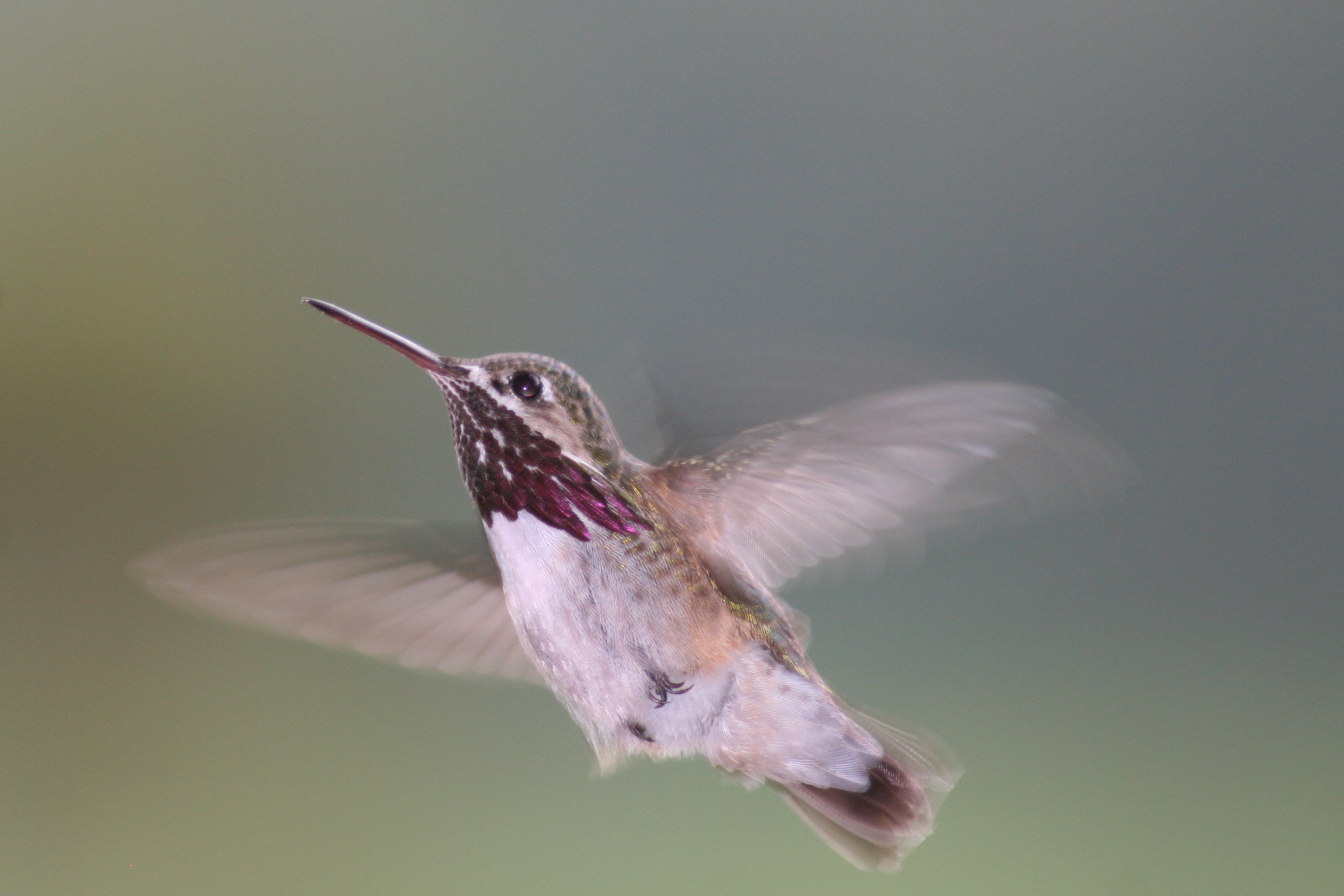
A hovering male calliope

== Temperature regulation ==
The high metabolic rate of calliope hummingbirds – especially during rapid forward flight and hovering – produces increased body heat that requires specialized mechanisms of temperature regulation for dissipating heat, which becomes an even greater challenge in hot, humid climates. As the smallest North American hummingbird species, calliopes appear to adapt their relatively higher surface-to-volume ratio to improve convective cooling from air movement by the wings. When air temperatures rise above 36 °C (97 °F), thermal gradients driving heat passively by convective dissipation from around the eyes, shoulders, and feet are reduced or eliminated, requiring heat dissipation mainly by evaporation and exhalation.

All hummingbirds dissipate heat partially by exhaled air, and from body structures with thin or no feather covering, such as around the eyes, shoulders, under the wings (patagia), and feet. While hovering, calliope hummingbirds do not benefit from the heat loss by air convection during forward flight, except for air movement generated by their rapid wing-beat, possibly aiding convective heat loss from the extended feet.

== Status ==
As of 2019, calliope hummingbirds have a relatively stable breeding population of about 4.5 million. As this species has a restricted wintering range in Mexico and travels an exceptional migratory distance annually of up to 9,000 km, it is on a watchlist for factors that could diminish the population.

=== Threats ===
The calliope hummingbird does not have many predators. Its biggest threat is likely long cold spells since they reduce the volume of insects and nectar available in its environment. The calliope hummingbird may be aggressive in its territory with other hummingbird species and birds, including Gray Flycatchers, American Robins, and Red-tailed Hawks.
