= Ted Levin =

American naturalist and author

Ted Levin is an American naturalist and author.

In 2004, his book Liquid Land won the Burroughs Medal.

== Books ==
- Backtracking: The Way of a Naturalist (Chelsea Green, 1987)
- Blood Brook: A Naturalist's Home Ground (Chelsea Green, 1992)
- Liquid Land: A Journey through the Florida Everglades (University of Georgia Press, 2004)
- America’s Snake: The Rise and Fall of the Timber Rattlesnake (University of Chicago Press, 2016)
- The Promise of Sunrise: Finding Solace in a Broken World (Green Writers Press, 2025)
