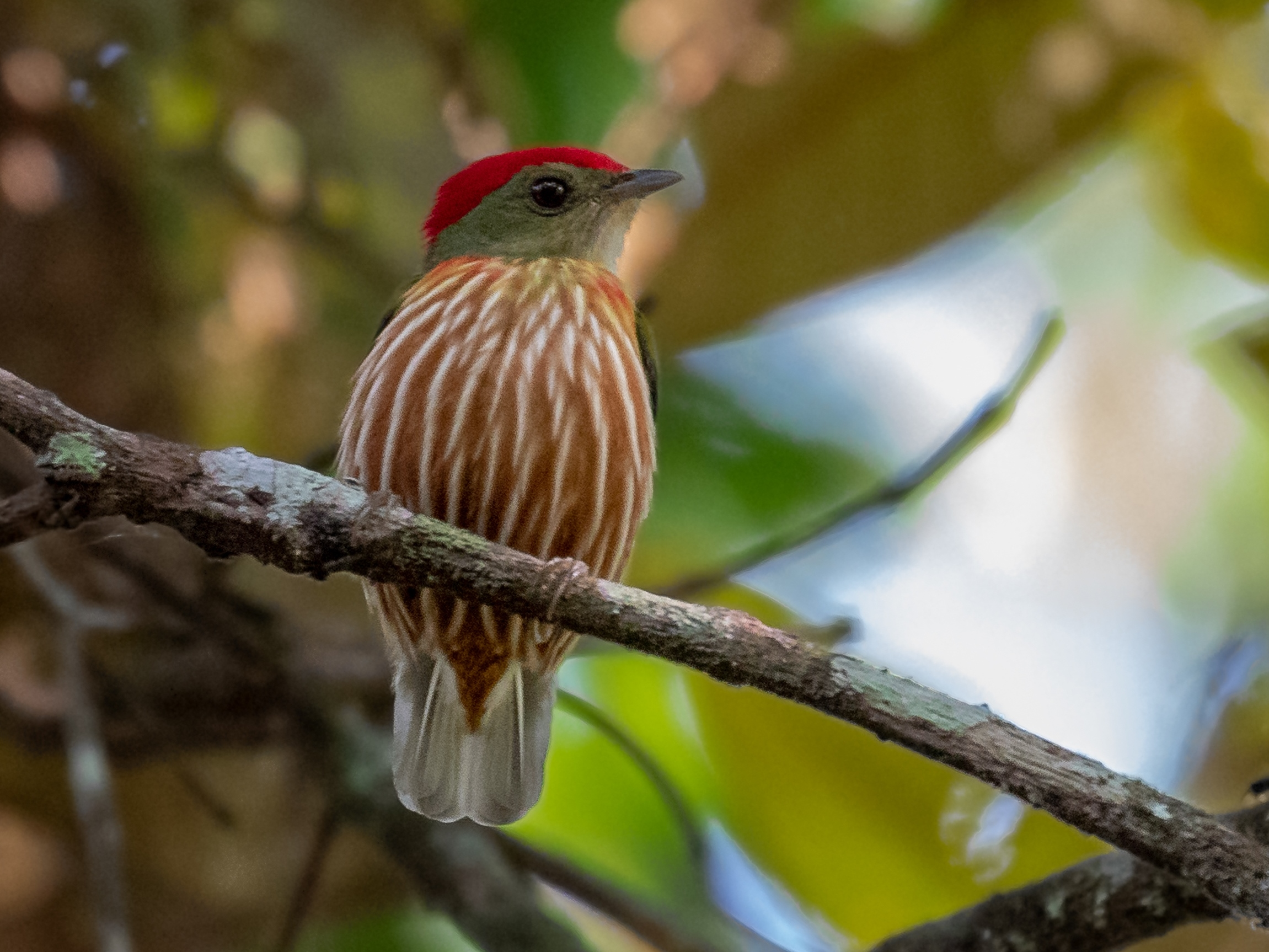

Conservation status
- Least Concern (IUCN 3.1)

Scientific classification
- Kingdom: Animalia
- Phylum: Chordata
- Class: Aves
- Order: Passeriformes
- Family: Pipridae
- Genus: Machaeropterus
- Species: M. striolatus

Binomial name
- Machaeropterus striolatus (Bonaparte, 1838)

= Striolated manakin =

Species of bird

Call recorded in Ecuador

The striolated manakin or western striped manakin (Machaeropterus striolatus) is a small South American species of passerine bird in the family Pipridae. It is found in Brazil, Colombia, Ecuador, Guyana, Peru, and Venezuela.

== Taxonomy and systematics ==
The striolated manakin was originally described by the French naturalist Charles Lucien Bonaparte in 1838 and given the binomial name Pipra striolata. The species is now placed in the genus Machaeropterus that was introduced by Bonaparte in 1854.

The striolated manakin has five subspecies. They were long treated as subspecies of M. regulus with the English name "striped manakin". Following several studies published beginning in 1999, taxonomic systems began separating M. striolatus from M. regulus with the respective English names "western" and "eastern" striped manakin. By 2018 systems were using the current English names "striolated" and "kinglet" manakin for the two.

The five subspecies are:

- M. s. antioquiae Chapman, 1924
- M. s. striolatus (Bonaparte, 1838)
- M. s. obscurostriatus Phelps & Gilliard, 1941
- M. s. zulianus Phelps & Phelps Jr, 1952
- M. s. aureopectus Phelps & Gilliard, 1941

The morphologically similar painted manakin from northern Peru was described in 2017. It differs from the striolated manakin in its vocalization.

== Description ==
The striolated manakin is 9 to 10.3 cm (3.5 to 4.1 in) long and weighs 6.4 to 12.5 g (0.23 to 0.44 oz). The species is sexually dimorphic. Adult males of the nominate subspecies M. s. striolatus have a bright red forehead, crown, and nape. Their face, upperparts, and tail are bright olive-green. Their wings are mostly a grayer olive-green than the upperparts and have white tips on the tertials and white inner webs on the other flight feathers. Their chin and throat are buff or whitish. The rest of their underparts are whitish with bold red stripes on the breast, belly, and flanks. Adult females have no red on their head. Their upper breast has a yellow stain and the streaks on their underparts are only on the belly and flanks. Both sexes have a deep red-brown iris, a dark horn to blackish maxilla, a paler mandible with a dark tip, and purplish pink legs and feet with rose-colored soles.

The other subspecies of the striolated manakin differ from the nominate and each other thus:

- M. s. antioquiae: male has darker red crown and more yellowish green upperparts than nominate, with white streaks on the throat; female is essentially identical to nominate
- M. s. obscurostriatus: male has reddish streaks on upper breast that become rufous lower down and an orange-yellow iris; female has dull olive throat and upper breast; both sexes have a brown bill and grayish olive-green legs and feet
- M. s. zulianus: male has red breast with dark chestnut streaks; female has whitish underparts with weak chestnut streaks; both sexes have an orange iris
- M. s. aureopectus: male has orange wash on uppertail coverts, black centers on underparts' streaks, and yellow-stained chest; female has more whitish underparts than nominate with faint yellow on the breast; both have a red iris

== Distribution and habitat ==
The subspecies of the striolated manakin are found thus:

- M. s. antioquiae: Colombia in Caribbean region and valleys of Cauca and Magdalena rivers
- M. s. striolatus: eastern third of Colombia south through eastern Ecuador into Peru to northern Ucayali and east into Brazil's Acre, central Amazonas and northwestern Rondônia
- M. s. obscurostriatus: Venezuela on west side of Andes from Mérida north into Trujillo
- M. s. zulianus: Venezuela on east side of Serranía del Perijá, southern Maracaibo Basin, Zulia, and east side of Andes from northwestern Barinas north to southeastern Táchira
- M. s. aureopectus: southeastern Venezuela in central Amazonas, northwestern to southeastern Bolívar, and east into western Guyana and far northern Roraima in Brazil

The striolated manakin primarily inhabits humid terra firme forest, to a lesser extent mature secondary forest, and sometimes forest edges if there are fruiting trees. In Colombia it reaches an elevation of 1,500 m (4,900 ft) and in Ecuador it is mostly below 700 m (2,300 ft) but reaches 1,100 m (3,600 ft) in the south. In Peru it is found between 1,000 and 1,350 m (3,300 and 4,400 ft) and in Venezuela mostly between 300 and 1,200 m (1,000 and 3,900 ft).

== Behavior ==
=== Movement ===
The striolated manakin is a sedentary year-round resident.

=== Feeding ===
The striolated manakin feeds on small fruits and insects, but details are lacking. It takes them with short sallies from a perch.

=== Breeding ===
The striolated manakin's breeding season has not been detailed. In Colombia it appears to span from April to August and possibly all the way to October. In Ecuador it apparently includes December to March. Males display to females in a small "exploded" lek. The display includes vertical jumps from a perch with vibrating wings that make a mechanical whir and also spinning on and under the perch. The species' nest is a small open cup of plant fibers bound with spider web and attached with web in a horizontal branch fork. Often strips of material dangle from the bottom of the nest. Most that have been found were within about 1 m (3 ft) of the ground in a low shrub or sapling. The clutch size, incubation period, and time to fledging are not known. It appears that the female alone incubates; and other details of parental care are not known.

=== Vocalization ===
The male striolated manakin's "advertising call" varies among the subspecies but is "always somewhat insect-like". In Ecuador its song is described as a repeated "soft, clear, whistled who-cheéuw". In Peru it is described as "a high, sneezy cli-CHEW!".

== Status ==
The IUCN has assessed the striolated manakin as being of Least Concern. It has a very large range; its population size is not known and is believed to be decreasing. No immediate threats have been identified. It is considered fairly common in Colombia and Ecuador, uncommon in Peru, "fairly common very locally" in Venezuela, and fairly common in Brazil. It occurs in a few protected areas.
