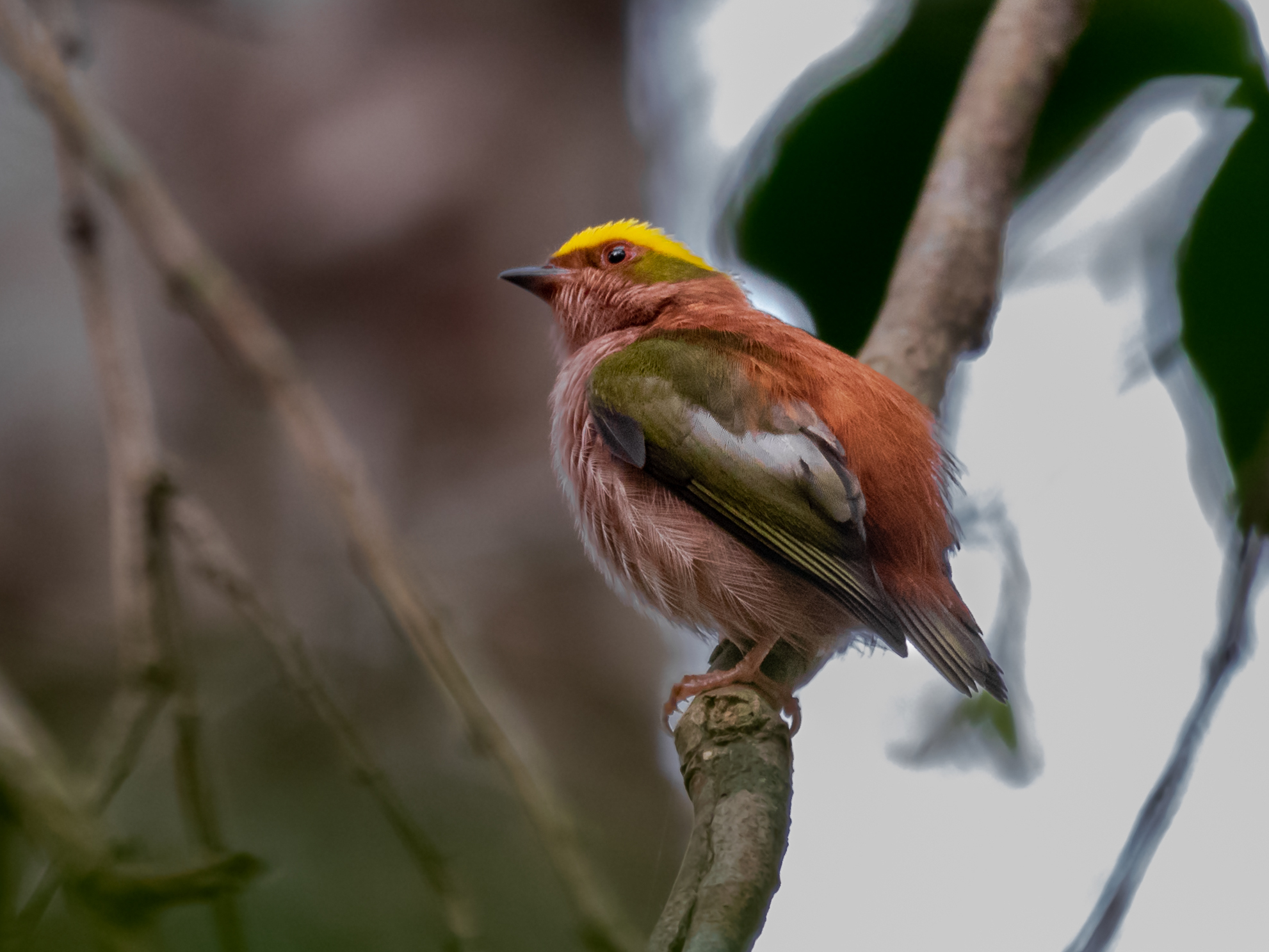
- Male

Conservation status
- Least Concern (IUCN 3.1)

Scientific classification
- Kingdom: Animalia
- Phylum: Chordata
- Class: Aves
- Order: Passeriformes
- Family: Pipridae
- Genus: Machaeropterus
- Species: M. pyrocephalus

Binomial name
- Machaeropterus pyrocephalus (Sclater, PL, 1852)

= Fiery-capped manakin =

Species of bird

The fiery-capped manakin (Machaeropterus pyrocephalus) is a species of bird in the family Pipridae. It is found in Bolivia, Brazil, Colombia, Peru, and Venezuela.

== Taxonomy and systematics ==
The fiery-capped manakin was originally described in 1852 as Pipra pyrocephala. The species is now placed in the genus Machaeropterus that was introduced by Bonaparte in 1854.

The fiery-capped manakin has two subspecies, the nominate M. p. pyrocephalus (Sclater, PL, 1852) and M. p. pallidiceps (Zimmer, JT, 1936). It shares genus Machaeropterus with four other species.

== Description ==
The fiery-capped manakin is 8 to 9 cm (3.1 to 3.5 in) long and weighs about 10 g (0.35 oz). The species is sexually dimorphic. Adult males of the nominate subspecies have the golden crown and nape with a red stripe in the middle that give the species its English name and specific epithet. The rest of their face is olive. Their upperparts are rosy rufous to maroon. Their tail and most of their wing are olive. Their wings have some white on the inner secondaries and some black spots on the tertials. Their throat is whitish and the rest of their underparts are streaked with dull pink and whitish. Adult females have olive upperparts, a pale grayish throat, and dull pale olive underparts with some blurry streaking and a yellowish tinge on the belly. Males of subspecies M. p. pallidiceps have a paler yellow crown than the nominate and a much reduced red stripe through it; they are otherwise like the nominate. Females are like the nominate. Both sexes of both subspecies have a dark red iris, a blackish bill with a paler base to the mandible, and pinkish to purplish-cream legs and feet. Juveniles of both sexes resemble adult females.

== Distribution and habitat ==
The fiery-capped manakin has a disjunct distribution. Subspecies M. p. pallidiceps is the more northerly of the two. It is found in Venezuela in the Orinoco Basin on the lower the Caura River and the middle Paragua River in Bolívar; there is also a sight record in northwestern Amazonas. It also occurs in northern Roraima in extreme northern Brazil. Though Colombia is not included as part of its range by the IOC, the independent South American Classification Committee has records in that country. The nominate subspecies has an oddly-shaped distribution in the Amazon Basin within which it is found at scattered sites. In Peru there is a small separate area in San Martín. Its principal range in that country is in the southeast in Ucayali and Madre de Dios. From there its range continues east through northern Bolivia and into Brazil. In Brazil it is found in Acre and southern Amazonas. The major part of its Brazilian range extends from Rondônia northeast across northern Mato Grosso and through Pará in a narrow band to the Atlantic at the mouth of the Amazon. South of that it continues across most of Mato Grosso and beyond to western Bahia and northwestern Minas Gerais.

The fiery-capped manakin inhabits the interior and edges of humid primary and secondary forest and woodland. In elevation it is found between about 100 and 200 m (300 and 700 ft) in Venezuela and mostly up to 1,100 m (3,600 ft) though locally to 1,200 m (3,900 ft) in Peru.

== Behavior ==
=== Movement ===
The fiery-capped manakin is believed to be a year-round resident.

=== Feeding ===
The fiery-capped manakin feeds on small fruits; those of Melastomataceae are favored. It typically plucks fruit while perched. It also takes small insects, usually in mid-air.

=== Breeding ===
The fiery-capped manakin's breeding season has not been defined but includes March in Venezuela. Males display at an "exploded" lek. They hang head downward from a branch and very quickly twist back and forth. The only known nest was in Venezuela; it was a small cup with dead leaves on its outside and a lining of coarse fibers. It was about 1 m (3 ft) above the ground in a sapling's branch fork and contained two eggs. Nothing else is known about the species' breeding biology.

=== Vocal and non-vocal sounds ===
The male fiery-capped manakin's "advertising call" is "a high-pitched bell-like or frog-like pling". During its display its wings make a loud "zssssss".

== Status ==
The IUCN has assessed the fiery-capped manakin as being of Least Concern. It has a very large range; its population size is not known and is believed to be decreasing. No immediate threats have been identified. It is considered "very local" in Venezuela, "generally uncommon" in Peru, and rare to uncommon in Brazil. It occurs in several protected areas in Brazil and a few in Peru and Bolivia.
