= Jan DeBlieu =

American writer

- Born: 1955 (age 70–71); Parkersburg, West Virginia, U.S.
- Education: University of Delaware
- Occupations: Author; essayist
- Spouse: Jeffrey Smith DeBlieu
- Children: 1 (deceased)
- Writing career
- Notable awards: John Burroughs Medal (1999)
- Website: www.jandeblieu.com

Jan DeBlieu (born 1955) is an American author and essayist whose work often focuses on how people are shaped by the landscapes and places where they live. Her writing has been deeply influenced by the time she spent on the Outer Banks of North Carolina, her longtime home, and the landscape of her new home, the midcoast of Maine, where she moved in 2018 to escape sea level rise and strengthening tropical storms.

She is the author of four books, including Hatteras Journal (1987), Meant to Be Wild (1991), Wind (1998) (which won the John Burroughs Medal for Distinguished Natural History Writing, the highest national honor for that genre) and Year of the Comets (2005). She also has published dozens of essays and magazine articles, both in literary journals and mainstream publications like The New York Times Magazine, Smithsonian, Audubon, and Orion. Her work has been widely anthologized. Online she has blogged for The Huffington Post, Tiny Buddha, and other sites. She was a major contributor to Home Ground: A Guide to the American Landscape, edited by Barry Lopez and Debra Gwartney (2006).

== Early life and education ==
Born in 1955 in Parkersburg, West Virginia, her family moved to Wilmington, Delaware, when she was 18 months old. She grew up in Wilmington, attended the University of Delaware, and began working as a reporter for the Wilmington News-Journal newspapers while still in college.

== Career ==
She worked briefly as a newspaper journalist but has spent most of her career writing essays, magazine articles, and books about natural landscapes and how the places where we spend our time help shape who we are.

In 1985, she moved to the Outer Banks, the islands off North Carolina where she would spend more than three decades living and writing. She became one of the region's most well-known literary voices. Winning the 1999 John Burroughs Medal for Natural History Writing placed her book Wind in the company of books by Aldo Leopold, Rachel Carson, Barry Lopez, and other major writers.

DeBlieu has frequently taught writing workshops at colleges and universities. From 2003 to 2012, she worked as an environmental activist for the North Carolina Coastal Federation, a nonprofit organization. She was a faculty member in the University of Alaska Anchorage's Masters of Creative Writing Low Residency Program from 2016 to 2020.

In 2009, the DeBlieus’ only son was killed in an automobile accident. That experience launched Jan into a new line of inquiry: exploring the question of how to best help people in need or trouble. For several years, she wrote blogs and essays about selfless service but never finished the book she had planned on the subject.

In 2018, alarmed by the changes they were seeing on the Outer Banks from sea level rise, strengthening hurricanes, and overdevelopment, the DeBlieus left the Outer Banks and moved to the midcoast of Maine. Jan's latest writings concentrate on her experiences as a climate change migrant and on questions of what shapes our individual perceptions of Home.

DeBlieu has been an active conservationist. In addition to her role as a coastkeeper for the NC Coastal Federation, in 1988 she helped form a grassroots conservation group that battled against a plan by Mobil and other oil companies to drill for natural gas off the Outer Banks.

In 2006, she was featured in the book Bedrock: Writers on the Wonders of Geology edited by Lauret E. Savoy, Eldridge M. Moores, and Judith E. Moores (Trinity University Press) which looks at how writing pays a tribute to the Earth's geological features.

== Personal life ==
She is married to Jeffrey Smith DeBlieu.

== Sources ==
- Personal information from Jan DeBlieu's web site: http://www.jandeblieu.com
- Orion magazine contributors page with publication credits: https://orionmagazine.org/contributor/jan-deblieu/
- Early life information from Enclopedia.com: http://explordia.iliensale.com/arts/educational-magazines/deblieu-jan-1955
- Official list of John Burroughs medal winners: John Burroughs Medal
- University of Alaska Anchorage faculty profile: https://www.uaa.alaska.edu/academics/college-of-arts-and-sciences/departments/english/CWLA-faculty/deblieu.cshtml
- Huffington Post contributor's profile: https://www.huffpost.com/author/jdeblieu-296
- Personal web site account of moving to Maine: http://www.jandeblieu.com/my-story
- Mother Jones article on the fight against Outer Banks offshore oil drilling: https://www.motherjones.com/politics/2001/09/keeping-coast-clear/
