= Lawrence Kilham =

American physician

Lawrence Kilham (10 August 1910, in Brookline, Massachusetts – 21 September 2000, in Lyme, New Hampshire), was a physician, virologist, amateur ornithologist, and nature writer. He is credited as the discoverer of K virus (1952) and, with L. J. Olivier, Kilham rat virus (1959), the first protoparvovirus identified.

Kilham received his bachelor's degree in 1932 and his M.S. in biology in 1935 from Harvard University and then his M.D. in 1940 from Harvard Medical School. As an intern in Cleveland, Ohio, he married an intern, Jane K. Kilham (1912–1992). Early in WW II, husband and wife went to England, and after D-Day Lawrence Kilham served in field hospitals as a doctor in the Third Army under Patton. In 1945, Lawrence Kilham returned to graduate school to do research on virology and to teach epidemiology. He was a virology researcher from 1949 to 1960 and in 1961 he became a professor at Dartmouth Medical School (Geisel School of Medicine), retiring there as professor emeritus in 1978.

Lawrence Kilham was widely recognized for his research with viruses and infectious diseases, publishing nearly 150 articles and discovering a new group of viruses with single-stranded DNA. ... By the early 1950s, Lawrence was serious about birds, joining both the AOU The American Ornithologists' Union and the Wilson Ornithological Society in 1952. It was while doing viral research in Uganda in 1954–1955, that he developed a research interest in bird behavior. From that point on, his work with the behavior of birds and mammals, an avocation, became a passion that led to more than 90 publications in the ornithological and behavioral literature.

He was elected a fellow of the American Ornithologists' Union in 1974. He was awarded the John Burroughs Medal in 1989 for his 1979 book On Watching Birds.

Lawrence Kilham died at his home in Lyme, New Hampshire on 21 Sep 2000. He was predeceased by his wife and a son, Peter. He was survived by three sons, Benjamin, Michael, and Joshua, and a daughter, Phoebe.

== Books ==
- Never Enough of Nature. Foster, Rhode Island: Droll Yankees Inc. 1977; 273 pages
- On Watching Birds. Chelsea, Vermont: Chelsea Green Publishing Company. 1979; 187 pages, illustrated by Joan Waltermire, with an introduction by John Kenneth Terres; reissued as A Naturalist's Field Guide. Harrisburg, Pennsylvania: Stackpole Books. 1981.
- Life History Studies of Woodpeckers of Eastern North America. no. 20. Publications of the Nuttall Ornithological Club. 1983.
- The American Crow and the Common Raven. College Station, Texas: Texas A & M University Press. 1989; illustrated by Joan Waltermire
