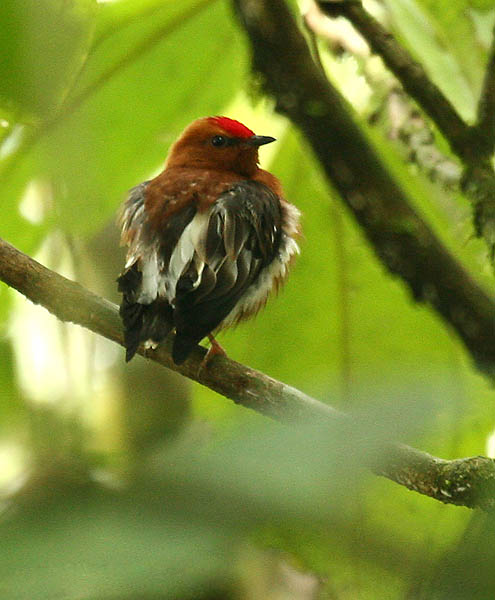
- Club-winged manakin (Machaeropterus deliciosus)

Scientific classification
- Kingdom: Animalia
- Phylum: Chordata
- Class: Aves
- Order: Passeriformes
- Family: Pipridae
- Genus: Machaeropterus; Bonaparte, 1854

Type species
- Pipra strigilata zu Wied, 1822

= Machaeropterus =

Genus of birds

Machaeropterus is a genus of passerine birds in the manakin family Pipridae. They are found in the tropical forests of South America.

== Taxonomy ==
The genus Machaeropterus was introduced by the French naturalist Charles Lucien Bonaparte in 1854. The type species was subsequently designated as the kinglet manakin. The name Machaeropterus combines the Ancient Greek words μαχαιρα makhaira "knife" or "dagger" and -πτερος -pteros "-winged".

The genus contains the five species:

| Image | Scientific name | Common name | Distribution |
|---|---|---|---|
| | Machaeropterus deliciosus | Club-winged manakin | Colombia and northwestern Ecuador. |
| | Machaeropterus regulus | Kinglet manakin | Atlantic Forest of south eastern Brazil |
| | Machaeropterus striolatus (split from M. regulus) | Striolated manakin | Colombia, east Ecuador, east Peru and west Amazonian Brazil, Venezuela and west Guyana |
| | Machaeropterus eckelberryi | Painted manakin | north west Peru. |
| | Machaeropterus pyrocephalus | Fiery-capped manakin | Brazil, southeast Peru, and northern Bolivia; also Venezuela |
