= David George Campbell =

American ecologist, environmentalist, and author

- Born: January 28, 1949 (age 77); Decatur, Illinois
- Education: Kalamazoo College; University of Michigan; Johns Hopkins School of Public Health
- Occupations: Ecologist, environmentalist

David George Campbell (born January 28, 1949, in Decatur, Illinois, United States) is an American educator, ecologist, environmentalist, and award-winning author of non-fiction. He is the son of George R. Campbell (1918–2004) and Jean Blossom Weilepp (1917–1998).

Campbell spent his childhood on Eleuthera Island, Bahamas, in Rio de Janeiro, Brazil, and Grosse Pointe, Michigan. He received a BS in biology from Kalamazoo College (1971), an MS in biology from the University of Michigan (1973), and a Ph.D. from the Johns Hopkins School of Public Health (1984). He is married to Karen S. Lowell, a phytochemist; they have a daughter.

== Bahama Islands ==
From 1974-1977, Campbell was the executive Director of the Bahamas National Trust, the organization responsible for parks, reserves, and setting priorities for wildlife conservation in the Bahamian Archipelago. As director he established priorities for the protection of island-endemic species including the rock iguanas (Cyclura spp.) and hutias, and started the process of the Bahamas becoming a signatory to the Convention on Trade in Endangered Species (CITES). His career in the Bahamas culminated in the publication of The Ephemeral Islands, the first natural history of the archipelago to be published since the 1800s.

== Chincoteague Bay ==
From 1978-1983, Campbell elucidated the etiology of gray crab disease, an amoebic pathogen that every spring kills ca. 30% of the blue crabs (Callinectes sapidus) in Chincoteague Bay, VA. His research showed that the disease is spread by cannibalism, mediated by ambient temperature and salinity.

== Amazonia ==
In 1974, Campbell was a botanical explorer at the Instituto Nacional de Pesquisas da Amazônia (INPA) in Manaus, Brazil, from where he staged expeditions to study the ethnobotany of the Jamamaji and Paumari Native Americans. Campbell joined the scientific staff of the New York Botanical Garden from 1984 to 1990, conducting floristic inventories throughout the Brazilian Amazon basin as part of the Projeto Flora Amazônica program; destinations included O Deserto on the Rio Xingu (Pará), the Rio Falsino (Amapá), Reserva Biológica Ilha de Maracá (Roraima), the Rio Moa and Serra do Divisor National Park (Acre).

These expeditions resulted in several notable papers on allelopathy, várzea floodplain forests and anthropogenic lianaceous forests. The Acre expeditions were chronicled in A Land of Ghosts, which won the Lannan Literary Award for Nonfiction.

== Antarctica, Africa and Asia ==
In the late 1980s and 1990s, Campbell shifted his research. He examined the impacts of elephants on west African forests, the diversity of subtropical forests in southern China, conducted research on the pathologies of krill and marine isopods in the waters of Admiralty Bay, King George Island (one of the South Shetlands of the Antarctic Peninsula), joined the sixth Brazilian expedition to Antarctica (1988), and lived at that nation's Comandante Ferraz Base. This experience was chronicled in The Crystal Desert, which won the Burroughs Medal, the PEN Martha Albrand Award and the Houghton Mifflin Literary Fellowship Award.

== Grinnell College ==
Since 1991 Campbell has been a professor of biology, chair of environmental studies and Henry R. Luce Professor in Nations and the Global Environment at Grinnell College. From 1994 to 2007 he and his Grinnell students conducted studies on the historical ecology of the Yucatec, Mopan and Kekchi Maya of Belize, using quantitative methods to test the long-held hypothesis that the Maya Forest is anthropogenic, even suggesting that its species composition was due to post-contact ranching. In 2010 Campbell extrapolated this controversial hypothesis to Amazonia, presenting evidence that pre-Columbian Native Americans caused a large-scale extinction of botanical diversity before the Europeans arrived.

== Books ==
- The Ephemeral Islands. 1977. Macmillan. London. ASIN: B0000EH0ZI
- Floristic Inventory of Tropical Countries. (coedited with H. D. Hammond). 1989. New York Botanical Garden. ISBN 0-89327-333-3
- The Crystal Desert: Summers in Antarctica. 1992. Houghton Mifflin. Boston. ISBN 0-618-21921-8 Campbell, David G. (2002-05-07). 2002 edition. Houghton Mifflin Harcourt. ISBN 0547527616; pbk, 336 pages
- Islands in Space and Time. 1996. Houghton Mifflin. Boston. ISBN 0-395-68083-2
- A Land of Ghosts. 2006. Houghton Mifflin. Boston. ISBN 0-8135-4052-6

== Honors and awards ==
- Guggenheim Fellowship (1989; General Nonfiction)
- Burroughs Medal (1994)
- Houghton Mifflin Literary Fellowship Award (1993)
- PEN/Martha Albrand Award for First Nonfiction (1993)
- Lannan Literary Award for Nonfiction (2005)
- Distinguished Alumni Award, Kalamazoo College (1995)
- Elected fellow of the Linnean Society of London, the Royal Geographical Society, the Explorers Club
- Appointed, the National Association of Science Writers (NASW).
