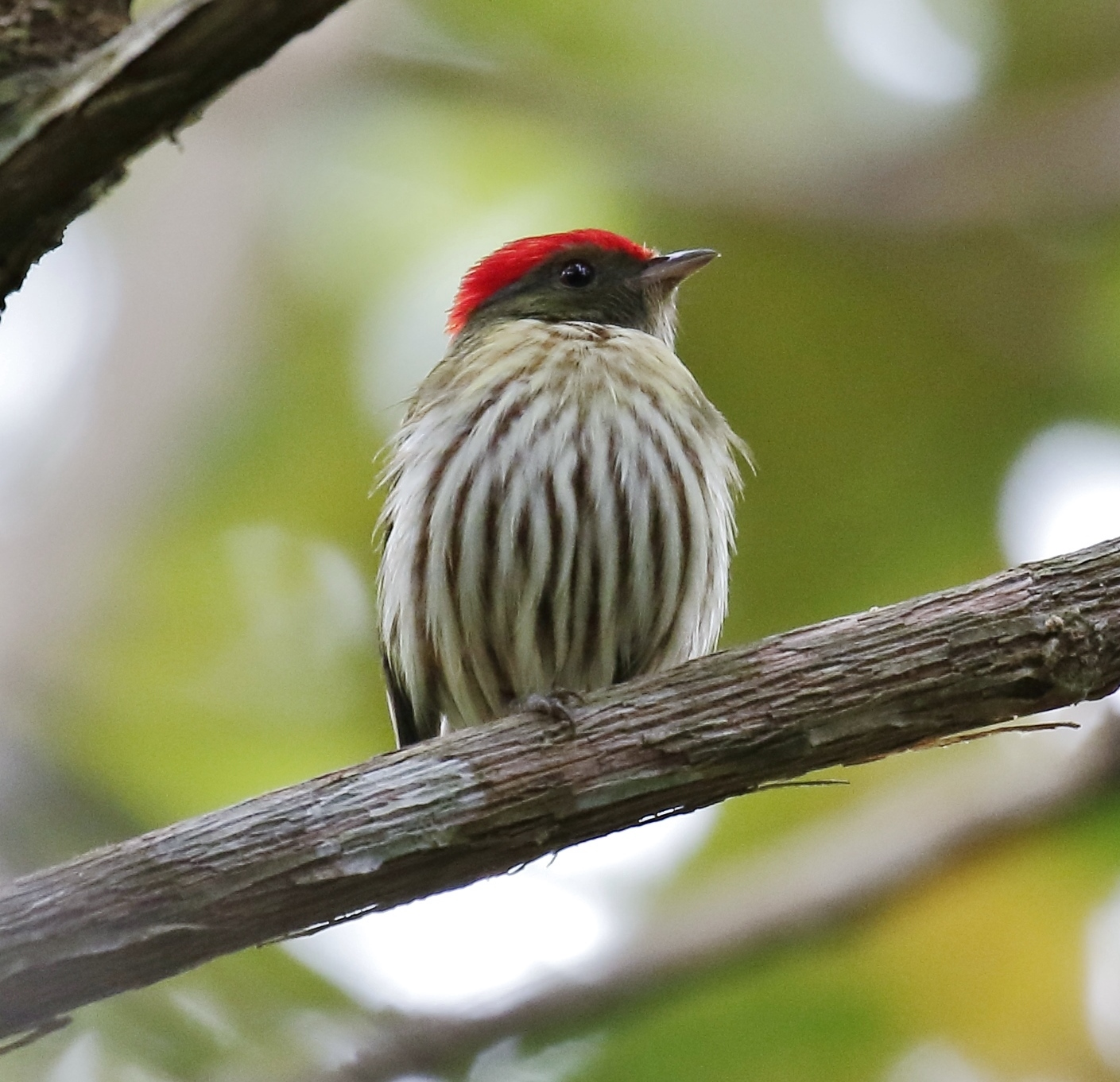
- Male

Conservation status
- Least Concern (IUCN 3.1)

Scientific classification
- Kingdom: Animalia
- Phylum: Chordata
- Class: Aves
- Order: Passeriformes
- Family: Pipridae
- Genus: Machaeropterus
- Species: M. regulus

Binomial name
- Machaeropterus regulus (Hahn, 1819)

= Kinglet manakin =

Species of bird

The kinglet manakin or eastern striped manakin (Machaeropterus regulus) is a small South American species of passerine bird in the manakin family Pipridae. It is endemic to Brazil.

== Taxonomy and systematics ==
The kinglet manakin was originally described by the German zoologist Carl Wilhelm Hahn in 1819 and given the binomial name Pipra regulus. The species is now placed in the genus Machaeropterus that was introduced by the French naturalist Charles Lucien Bonaparte in 1854.

The five subspecies of what is now the striolated manakin (M. striolatus) were long treated as subspecies of M. regulus with the English name "striped manakin". Following several studies published beginning in 1999, taxonomic systems began separating M. striolatus from M. regulus with the respective English names "western" and "eastern" striped manakin. By 2018 systems were using the current English names "striolated" and "kinglet" manakin.

The kinglet manakin is monotypic.

== Description ==
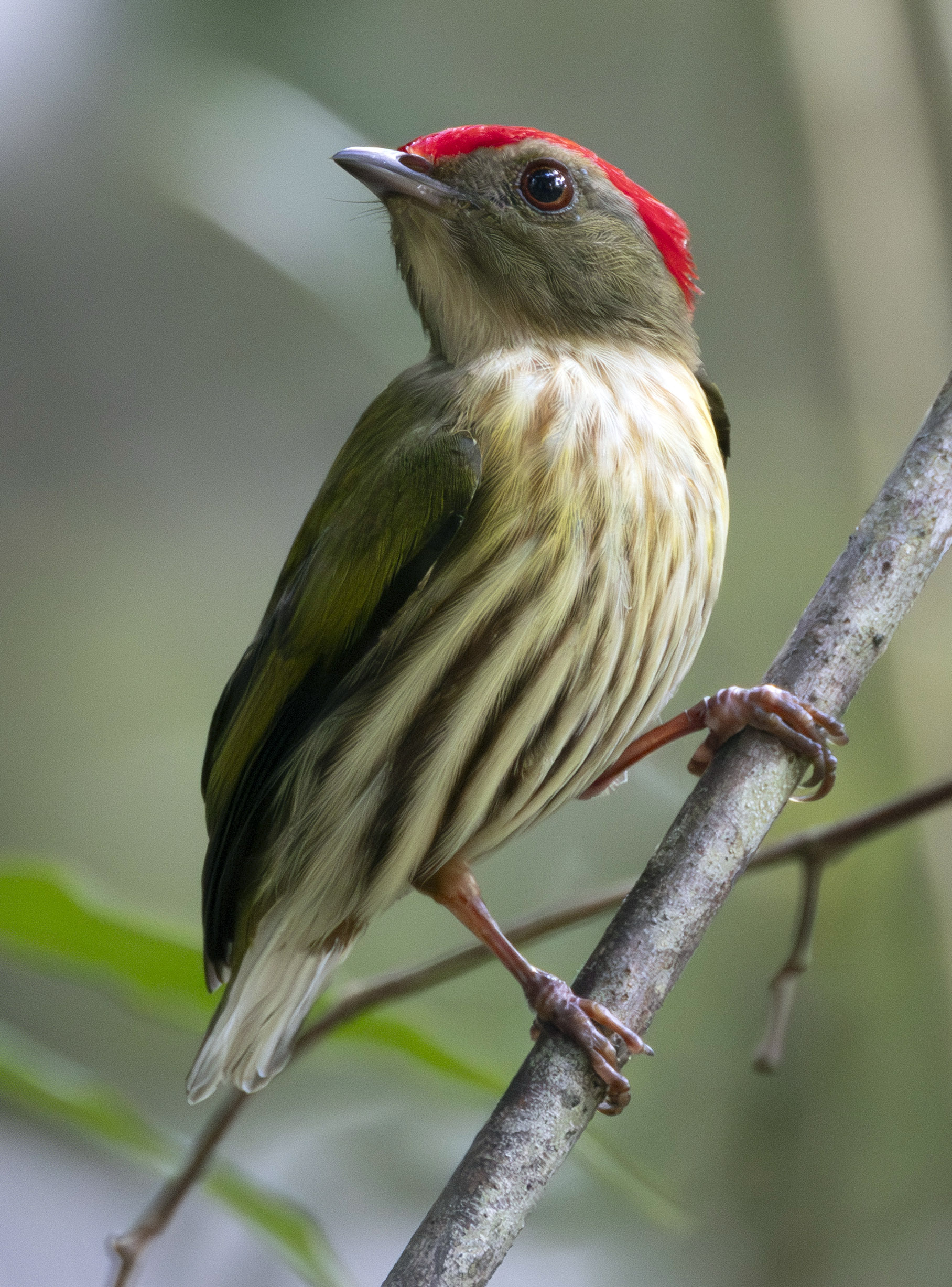
NE Brazil.

The kinglet manakin is 9 to 10.3 cm (3.5 to 4.1 in) long and weighs 6.4 to 12.5 g (0.23 to 0.44 oz). The species is sexually dimorphic. Adult males have a bright red forehead, crown, and nape. The rest of their face is a grayish olive-green. Their upperparts and tail are olive-green. Their wings are mostly olive-green with white tips on the secondaries. Their chin and throat are plain whitish. The rest of their underparts are whitish with thin red-brown stripes on the breast, belly, and flanks. Their thighs are red. Adult females have no red on their head and their face is grayer than the male's. The streaks on their underparts are only on the belly and flanks. Both sexes have a deep red or red-brown iris, a dark horn to blackish maxilla, and a paler mandible. Males have purplish beige to bright pink legs and feet; females' are often duller and paler. Juveniles of both sexes resemble adult females.

== Distribution and habit ==
The kinglet manakin is found in coastal southeastern Brazil from northeastern Bahia south at least to northern Rio de Janeiro state. There are scattered records south and inland of its contiguous range. It inhabits humid lowland forest including secondary forest and restinga. In elevation it ranges mostly from sea level to about 200 m (700 ft) but locally is found as high as about 600 m (2,000 ft).

== Behavior ==
=== Movement ===
The kinglet manakin is normally a near-round resident but there is at least one out-of-range occurrence during a local drought in its range.

=== Feeding ===
The diet and foraging behavior of the kinglet manakin have not been studied.

=== Breeding ===
The kinglet manakin's breeding season has not been defined but includes January and February. Males display at a lek. They hang head downward on a vertical stem, turn to and fro, spread the crown feathers, extend the wings, and extend and fan the tail. One nest has been photographed. It was in a three-way branch fork and appeared to have live moss on the outside, a pale lining, and to be held together and to the branch with spider web. It contained one egg. Nothing else is known about the species' breeding biology.

=== Vocalization ===
The kinglet manakin's call is a "mid-high, short, catlike tjew".

== Status ==
The IUCN has assessed the kinglet manakin as being of Least Concern. Its population size is not known and is believed to be decreasing. No immediate threats have been identified. It is considered rare to uncommon. It is found in several protected areas. However, "[i]ts population has undoubtedly been much reduced by extensive destruction of Atlantic coastal forest".
