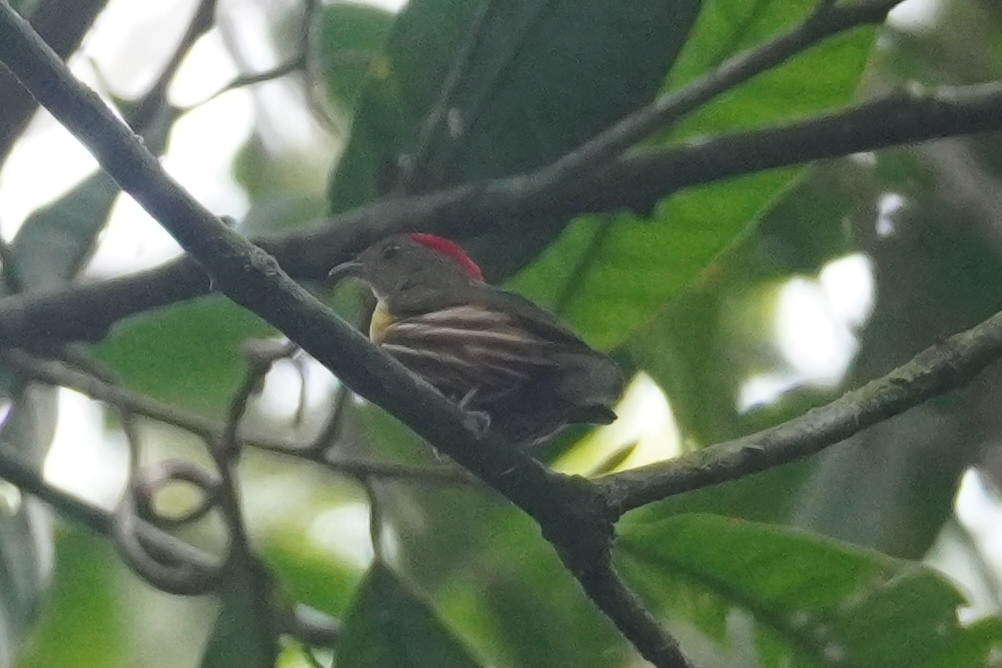

Scientific classification
- Kingdom: Animalia
- Phylum: Chordata
- Class: Aves
- Order: Passeriformes
- Family: Pipridae
- Genus: Machaeropterus
- Species: M. eckelberryi

Binomial name
- Machaeropterus eckelberryi Lane, Kratter & O'Neill, 2017

= Painted manakin =

Species of bird

The painted manakin (Machaeropterus eckelberryi) is a small South American species of passerine bird in the manakin family Pipridae. It was first described in 2017 from specimens collected in north west Peru. Painted manakin were initially seen in surveys of the Cordillera Azul in 1996, other research reveals the existence of female painted manakin in 1977.

== Taxonomy ==
The painted manakin was described by the American ornithologist Daniel Lane and colleagues in 2017 and given the binomial name Machaeropterus eckelberryi. The specific epithet was chosen to commemorate the American bird artist Donald R. Eckelberry (1921-2000). The species is placed in the genus Machaeropterus that was introduced by the French naturalist Charles Lucien Bonaparte in 1854.

The painted manakin was described as a new species based solely on the differences in vocalization. It is morphologically identical to one of the subspecies of the striolated manakin (M. striolatus aureopectus). No genetic evidence has been published. The species is found on the eastern flanks of the Cordillera Escalera and Cordillera Azul near the valley of the Rio Mayo in the San Martín and Loreto Regions of Peru.

The painted manakin has been recognised as a valid species by the South American Classification Committee of the American Ornithological Society and by Frank Gill and David Donsker who maintain a list of bird species on behalf of the International Ornithological Committee.

== Vocalization ==
The painted manakin differs in voice, its vocals are single-notes as opposed to the double-noted Striolated Manakin. The male song is simple and unmodulated, rising chiWEE which somewhat recalls an Eastern Wood-Pewee. Both sexes make four sounds: a snapping noise, a "combing" noise, whirring wings and “grrrt”

== Morphology ==
It is morphologically identical to one of the subspecies of the striolated manakin (M. striolatus aureopectus). Males are identified by a combination of their bright red cap, reddish-streaked underparts and their bright yellow breast-band. While females on the other hand are identified by their reddish-brown streaks on their belly and flanks. However, female painted manakin lack the bright red cap and yellow breast-band that males acquire. No genetic evidence has been published.

== Habitat ==
The species is found on the eastern flanks of the Cordillera Escalera and Cordillera Azul near the valley of the Rio Mayo in Peru. The painted manakin is located in a fairly small region in the foothills of north-central Peru near areas of San Martin and Loretio. The painted manakin is currently known in less than 10 localities. Additionally, there is a single female specimen that is located in the Ucayali department. The painted manakin lives in trees 5-10 meters (16-33 ft) from the ground. The soil is sandy and nutrient-deficient. The painted manakin inhabits low-elevation areas of Peru, where there is more foliage and plants. Painted manakin have an upper elevation limit of 1,400 meters (4593 ft) and a lower elevation limit of 400 meters (1312 ft). The painted manakin is found mainly in humid lowland forests.

== Conservation ==
The painted manakin has been recognised as a valid species by the South American Classification Committee of the American Ornithological Society and by Frank Gill and David Donsker who maintain a list of bird species on behalf of the International Ornithological Committee. The painted manakin is at no immediate risk of extinction. This is partially attributed to their location in Cordillera Azul National Park, a protected area of Peru. The painted manakin has no known threats. This is due to the poor soil in their habitat, which prevents their habitat from being used for agriculture. It is speculated that there are between 20,000 and 50,000 mature individuals in the wild.

== Behavior ==
The painted manakin displays the same behavioral traits of others in the Machaeropterus family. Males are known for singing in bursts. The males often perform rapid acrobatic flights, wing flicks, and posture displays while perched. The Manakin’s diet consists mostly of berries, from trees in the Melastomaceae family. The painted manakin occasionally eat arthropods during breeding season, as well as fruit. The painted manakin are known for nesting in the dry season, which consists of August through October. Males gather in leks where each defends a small perch. The painted manakin produces a mechanical wing sound which are short snapping noises aimed at attracting females. painted manakin do not migrate.
