= Rutherford Platt =

American nature writer and photographer

- Born: 11 August 1894; Columbus, Ohio
- Died: 28 March 1975 (aged 80); Boston, Massachusetts
- Education: Yale University, 1918
- Occupations: Advertising executive, nature writer, photographer
- Known for: nature writer
- Spouse: Jean Dana Rutherford (née Noyes)

Rutherford Hayes Platt Jr. (11 August 1894, Columbus, Ohio – 28 May 1975, Boston) was an American nature writer, photographer, and advertising executive.

== Biography ==
Platt served in WW I as a lieutenant in Battery F, Three Hundred Twenty-Third Field Artillery and, with McDonald H. Riggs, wrote a history of his unit. He received his bachelor's degree from Yale in 1918. In the early 1920s he was employed on the editorial staffs of The World's Work and of Doubleday Page & Company. He then became a corporate officer of Platt-Forbes, Inc., an advertising agency which represented several food and industrial companies, including Chance Vought Aircraft Corporation. In the mid‐1950s he became president of Platt Productions Educational Films, specializing in nature films.

He attended classes at the Brooklyn Botanic Garden and by 1930 had become keenly interested in nature and, in particular, photography of plant life. For many years, Mr. Platt's two-page spread of color photographs of mushrooms and other forms of fungi appeared in the "Mushrooms" article of the World Book Encyclopedia; some of these images also appeared in an article on mushrooms that he wrote for the August 28, 1944 issue of Life magazine.

Mr. Platt was botanist with Rear Adm. Donald B. MacMillan's Arctic expeditions in 1947 and 1954. He was biology adviser to the Disney True Life Films in the early nineteen‐fifties and was the author of "Walt Disney's Secrets of Life", published in 1957.

Platt was elected a fellow of the American Association for the Advancement of Science. He received the John Burroughs Medal in 1945 for his 1942 book This Green World.

== Family ==
Rutherford H. Platt, Jr.'s father was a son of a sister, Fanny Arabella née Hayes, of Rutherford B. Hayes. Rutherford H. Platt Jr. died at age 80 and upon his death was survived by his widow, several children, nine grandchildren, and three great-grandchildren, who are Kiran Platt, Camden Feingold, and Ali Feingold. At age 42, he divorced his first wife, Eleanor. In 1937 he married his second wife, Jean Dana née Noyes. There were two children from the first marriage and three children from the second marriage. One of his sons, Rutherford H. Platt, III, became a professor of geography at the University of Massachusetts Amherst and a specialist in land and water resource policy for urban areas.

== Books ==
- This green world. Dodd, Mead & Co. 1942.
- Our flowering world. Dodd, Mead & Co. 1947.
- American Trees, A Book of Discovery. Dodd, Mead & Co. 1952.
- The river of life. Simon & Schuster. 1956.
- 1001 questions answered about trees. Dodd, Mead & Co. 1959. Platt, Rutherford (5 May 2014). 2014 Dover reprint. ISBN 9780486167817; pbk, 352 pages
- Wilderness, the discovery of a continent of wonder. Dodd, Mead & Co. 1961.
- Adventures in the wilderness. American Heritage Publishing Co. 1963.
- The great American forest. Prentice-Hall. 1965.
- Discover American trees. Dodd, Mead & Co. 1968.
- Water, the wonder of life. Prentice-Hall. 1971.
