= Florence Page Jaques =

American author (1890-1972)

- Born: March 7, 1890; Decatur, Illinois
- Died: January 1, 1972 (aged 81); North Oaks, Minnesota
- Education: Millikin University; Columbia University
- Occupation: Writer
- Organizations: Society of Woman Geographers; Pi Beta Phi
- Spouse: Francis Lee Jaques
- Awards: John Burroughs Medal, 1946, for Snowshoe Country; alumni award from Millikin University, 1959

Florence Page Jaques (March 7, 1890 – January 1, 1972) was an American author who wrote nature and travel books for adults, and short stories and poetry for children. Born in Decatur, Illinois, she attended Millikin University in Decatur, completing an A.B. degree there in 1911 before doing graduate work at Columbia University in New York City.

She married Francis Lee Jaques, a wildlife painter for the American Museum of Natural History in New York, on May 12, 1927. Together they produced seven illustrated outdoor travel books, including Snowshoe Country, winner of the John Burroughs Medal in 1946 for distinguished work in natural history. The couple left New York for North Oaks, Minnesota, a suburb of Saint Paul, in 1953, and lived there for the rest of their lives. Francis died in 1969 and Florence in 1972.

== Bibliography ==
- Canoe Country (1938)
- The Geese Fly High (1939)
- Birds Across the Sky (1942)
- Snowshoe Country (1944)
- Canadian Spring (1947)
- As Far as the Yukon (1951)
- There Was Once a Puffin and Other Nonsense Verse (1956)
- Francis Lee Jaques: Artist of the Wilderness World (1973)

The Florence Page Jaques papers, consisting of a manuscript of There Once Was a Puffin and a typed script of a children's short story, "The Balloon Man Who Couldn't Get Home", are held in the archives of the Elmer L. Andersen Library at the University of Minnesota.
