= Michael Harwood (author) =

Michael Harwood (1934 – 24 November 1989) was a naturalist, environmentalist, and author who was born in Boston and died in San Diego.

Harwood received his secondary education from The Putney School in Vermont and graduated from Harvard University in 1956. He became the third husband of the author Mary B. Durant in 1966.

He was a co-winner of the 1981 John Burroughs Medal for On the Road With John James Audubon, which he co-authored with his wife Mary Durant. The book is organized as a travel journal which recounts how the two authors spent more than a year camping along the various North American itineraries recorded in Audubon's journals.

Harwood attended the 1974 foundational meeting and was a president of the Hawk Migration Association of North America. He was a member of the board of the Hawk Mountain Sanctuary at Kempton, Pennsylvania.

== Selected publications ==
- In the shadow of presidents: the American Vice-Presidency and succession system. Philadelphia: Lippincott. 1966.
- Games to play in the car. NY: Meredith Press. 1967.
- The view from Hawk Mountain. NY: Scribner. 1973.
- with Mary B. Durant: A country journal. NY: Dodd, Mead. 1974.
- with Eliot Porter: Moments of discovery. NY: Dutton. 1977; 120 pages, 70 photographic portraits by Porter of North American birds, text by Harwood
- The view from Great Gull. NY: Dutton. 1978.
- with Mary B. Durant: On the road with John Audubon. NY: Dodd, Mead. 1980.
- The curious country: Badlands National Park. Badlands National History Association. 1988.
