= Theodora Stanwell-Fletcher =

American naturalist and author

Theodora Stanwell-Fletcher (born Theodora Morris Cope, January 4, 1906, died Theodora Gray, January 15, 2000) was an American naturalist and writer. She is best known for her book Driftwood Valley (1946) which won the John Burroughs Medal for distinguished writing in natural history in 1948. She was recognized as a Distinguished Daughter of Pennsylvania and elected to the Society of Woman Geographers.

== Early life and education ==
Born in Germantown, Pennsylvania, to Francis R. Cope, Jr. and Evelyn Flower Morris, she lived much of her youth near rural Dimock, Pennsylvania, at the family home named Woodbourne. She graduated from Mount Holyoke College in 1929 with a BA in Economic Geography and English Literature. After she completed her bachelor's degrees, she and her father traveled around the world for a year visiting the South Pacific, Singapore, Australia, New Zealand, and the Dutch East Indies.

She earned a Master of Science in 1931 and a doctorate in vertebrate ecology in 1936 from Cornell University. Her master's thesis, Some Observations on the Vertebrate Ecology of a Pennsylvania Mountain Farm, was based on wildlife observations on her family property in Pennsylvania. Her doctoral dissertation, Observations on the Vertebrate Ecology of some Pennsylvania Virgin Forests, was based on wildlife observations in several locations in Pennsylvania. Both were written under her maiden name, Theodora M. Cope.

== Career ==
Her studies at Cornell included field work in Churchill, Manitoba, Canada in the 1930s where she studied plants and birds and observed other wildlife. It is here that she met her first husband, John (Jack) Stanwell-Fletcher. She fictionalized her experience in Churchill in her book The Tundra World (1952).

After John and Teddy were married on January 4, 1937, they began planning an extended trip to remote British Columbia to experience unsettled wilderness and to observe and collect flora and fauna for the British Columbia Provincial Museum. They began their trip in August 1937 by locating a remote place to build a cabin which would serve as their base for exploration. Local natives helped them identify and move to Tetana Lake in an area not previously settled and near an area labeled on maps as "Unsurveyed Area" with the nearest road over 200 miles away. There they built a cabin and began collecting specimens and making wildlife observations. Surviving winter that at times reached -60 degrees Fahrenheit with snow over ten feet deep and summer mosquito swarms, part of the adventure was in figuring out how to live, travel, and collect specimens in the harsh conditions. They interacted with natives who traveled through their area between settlements, the nearest of which was sixty miles away. From Tetana, they ventured into the surrounding area to collect firewood, hunt game for food, and to collect wildlife specimens.

They left British Columbia and returned to Pennsylvania in January 1939. In the two years they were in Pennsylvania, Teddy gave birth to her only child, and the Stanwell-Fletchers wrote about their experience thus far in a three-part article which detailed their wildlife observations, personal interactions, and daily life. She returned to Driftwood Valley in February 1941, where her husband had already arrived to prepare the cabin. This trip, which lasted until September 1941, ended in part because of the increased likelihood of entrance into World War II. In total on their two trips, they cataloged 280 plant, 13 fish, 139 bird, and 41 mammal species for the museum. These included collecting skins and skulls of mammals, ornithological specimen preparation, plant pressings, photos, drawings, and films. The official report to the museum of their trip is Some Accounts of the Flora and Fauna of the Driftwood Valley Region of North Central British Columbia authored by both Stanwell-Fletchers.

Her time in British Columbia was the basis for her book, Driftwood Valley (1946). The book, considered her most important work, is written as a journal documenting her and her husband's, referred to as simply "J.", life at Tetana Lake, wildlife observations, and musings on the people, animals, wilderness, and their relationships with them. More than just detailing expeditions and species identification, the book shows the author's love of remote areas and the life it contains. As a trained naturalist, she made close observations of animals and their behaviors. The book shows her love of adventure and the demanding physical effort needed to live in remote wilderness and also "makes valuable observations on gender-based work roles and the differences between men's and women's responses to the wilderness". The book won the John Burroughs Medal for distinguished writing in natural history in 1948.

After the success of her first book, she wrote The Tundra World (1952) which was a fictionalized version of her time in Churchill, Manitoba, Canada on the western shore of Hudson Bay. Based primarily on her collegiate work, it was also influenced by a second trip she took in the 1940s to gather more material. In the text, Rosamund Reeves serves as both the narrator and the fictionalized Teddy. The character Eric Grey is based on John Stanwell-Fletcher. This book is also written as a first-person journal with a focus on flora and fauna observations interspersed with the developing relationship between Reeves and Grey. It includes travels on Hudson Bay, interactions with settlers, workers, and the native populations. This book, like Driftwood Valley, shows "her love for the untouched natural world, appreciation of peace and quiet, [and] upset over humanity's despoliation of nature".

In 1956, she published Clear Lands and Icy Seas: A Voyage to the Eastern Arctic. This book was based on two summer trips to the Arctic from Montreal, Canada to Churchill via Hudson Bay on a Hudson's Bay Company steamship. Because the trip was made on a working steamship, opportunities for land-based wildlife observation were limited to brief supply delivery stops. While this book has been praised as having her most developed natural history descriptions and philosophical approach to nature., it is also noted that she is as interested in her fellow passengers as in the nature around her. In this book, like The Tundra World, the author fictionalized the names of many of the people.

== Later life ==
After splitting with John Stanwell-Fletcher, she remarried first to Lowell Sumner and then to Dr. Philip Hayward Gray. While she continued to travel, she never returned to the Driftwood Valley or Lake Tetana. After Philip Gray's death, she returned to her Woodbourne home where she died on January 15, 2000. Her family's land near Dimock, Pennsylvania was donated to the Nature Conservancy in several gifts beginning in 1956 and is now the Woodbourne Forest Preserve.
