= John Kenneth Terres =

American naturalist and author (1905–2006)

John Kenneth Terres (December 17, 1905 – December 8, 2006), was an American naturalist and author. He is best known for his popular works on North American birds. He authored more than fifty works, usually writing as John K. Terres.

He was born in Philadelphia, Pennsylvania and spent his early years in New Jersey. He was educated at State Teachers College (Indiana, Pennsylvania), Cornell University and New York University. In 1986, he received an honorary Doctor of Letters from the University of North Carolina. He received the John Burroughs Medal (1971) for From Laurel Hill to Siler's Bog, which detailed his explorations of Mason Farm Biological Reserve, part of the North Carolina Botanical Garden. Terres served as Editor of Audubon Magazine for twelve years (1948-1960).

He died 9 days before his 101st birthday on December 8, 2006.

== Selected works ==
- John K. Terres (1953). Songbirds in Your Garden. New York: Thomas Y. Crowell Company.
- John K. Terres (1960). The Wonders I See. Philadelphia, Pennsylvania: Lippincott.
- John K. Terres (1969). From Laurel Hill to Siler's Bog: The Walking Adventures of a Naturalist Chapel Hill, North Carolina: University of North Carolina Press. ISBN 978-0-8078-4426-7 (or ISBN 0-8078-4426-8)
- John K. Terres (1980). The Audubon Society Encyclopedia of North American Birds. New York: Knopf. ISBN 0-394-46651-9.

He was a contributing editor of Birder's World magazine, culminating with an article about American Crow behavior observations of his own, plus his own watercolors of crows performing the behaviors in the text. He died with the wish of revising his 1980 Audubon Encyclopedia of North American Birds, about which Roger Tory Peterson said never left his desk side. Birder's World published, before the crow article, a story about him, with a photograph of him at the University of North Carolina—Chapel Hill biological station, with much concentration examining a specimen.
