= Sonation =

Category of sounds produced by birds

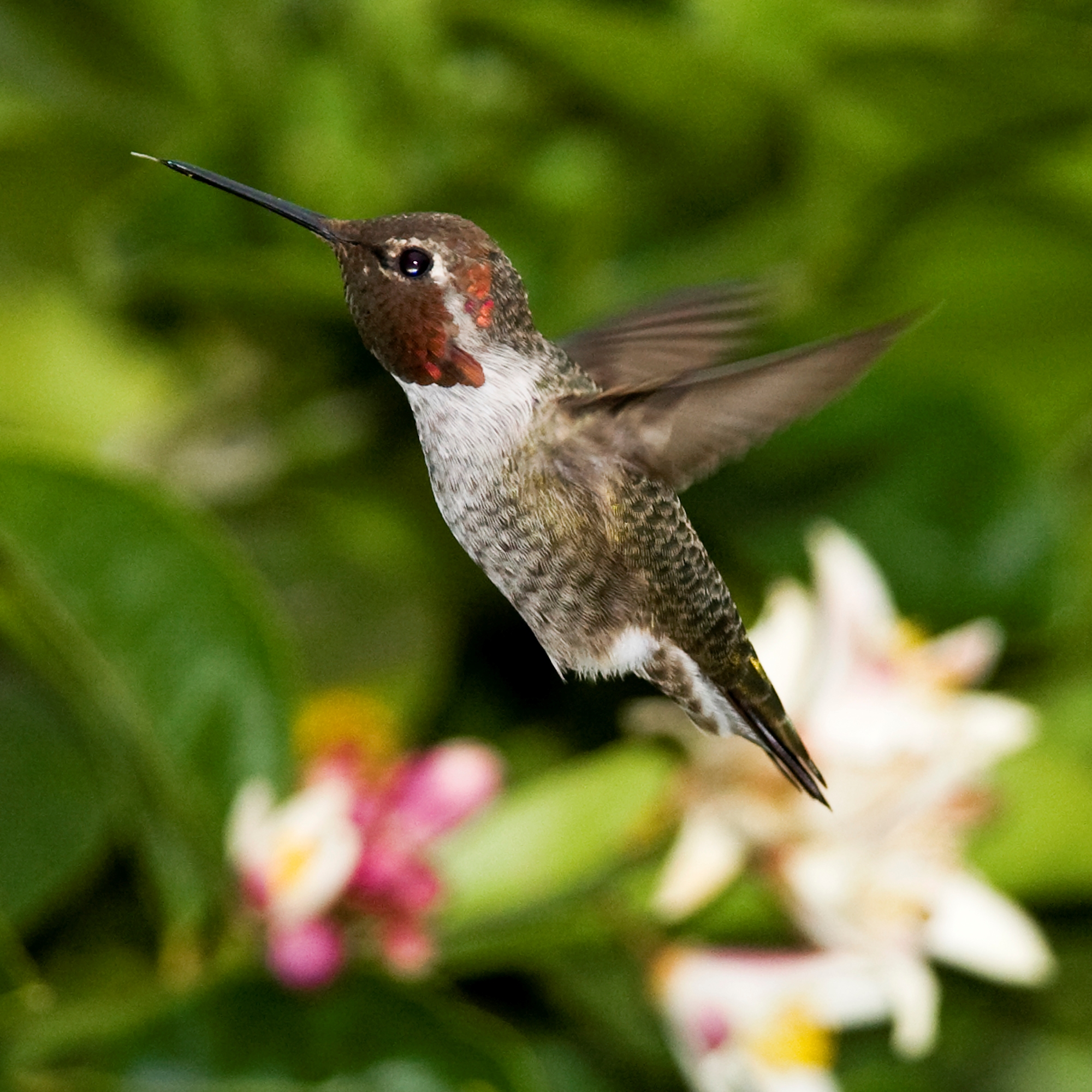
Anna's hummingbird

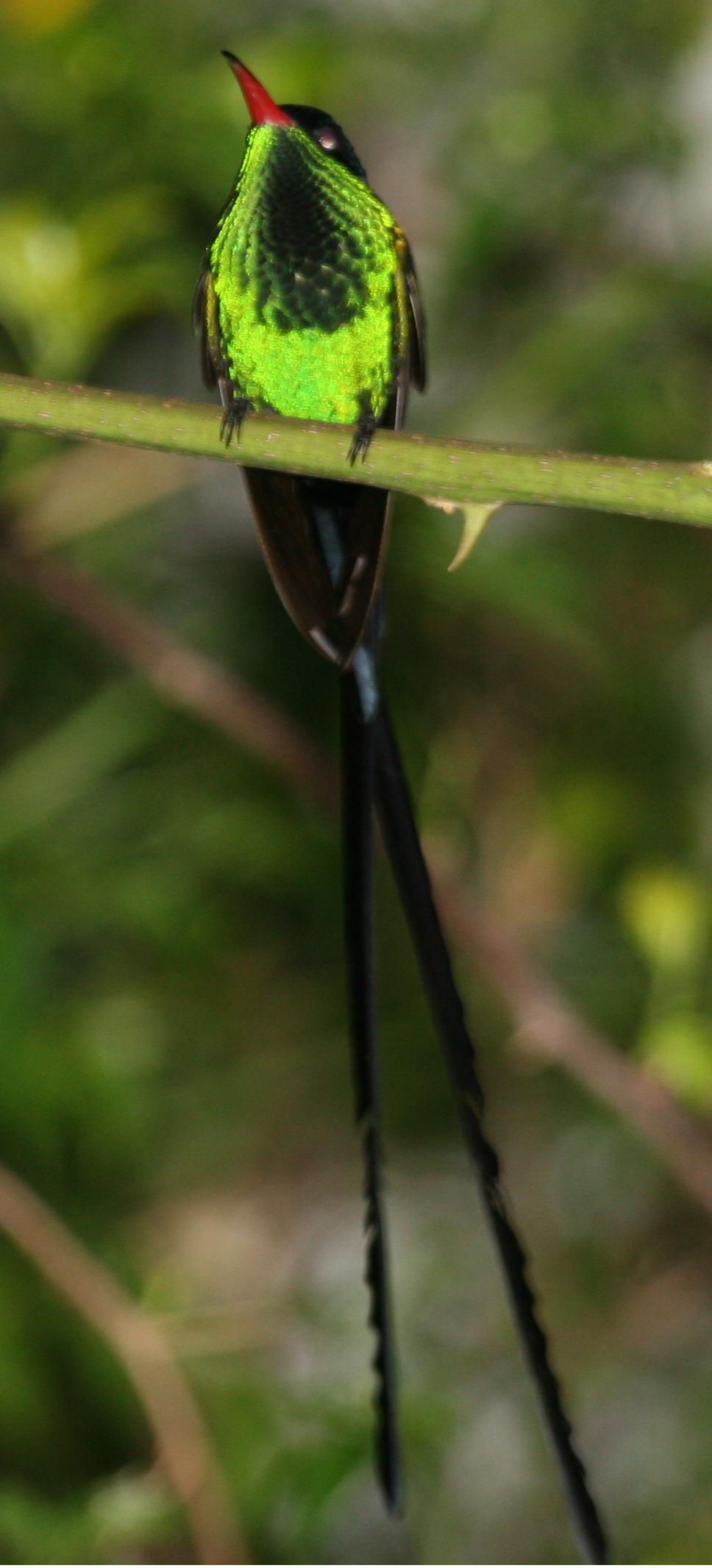
Red-billed streamertail

Sonation is the sound produced by birds, using mechanisms other than the syrinx. The term sonate is described as the deliberate production of sound, not from the throat, but rather from structures such as the bill, wings, tail, feet and body feathers, or by the use of tools.

Examples are the tonal sound produced by the tail-feathers of the Anna's hummingbird Calypte anna, the drumming of the tail-feathers of the African snipe and common snipe, bill-clattering by storks or the deliberate territorial tapping practised by woodpeckers and certain members of the parrot family, such as palm cockatoos which drum on hollow trees using broken-off sticks. The clapper lark's (Mirafra apiata) display flight includes a steep climb with wing rattling.

Barn owls produce a clicking snap to show annoyance or fear. Bustards, floricans and korhaans of the Otididae include foot-stamping in their mating displays. Studies have revealed at least four sonations employed by two manakin genera Manacus and Pipra – wing-against-wing claps carried out above the back, wing-against-body claps, wing-into-air flicks and wing-against-tail feathers. Video footage of male club-winged manakins, Machaeropterus deliciosus, shows them producing sustained harmonics derived from vibrating secondary wing feathers. This mechanism is the avian equivalent of arthropod stridulation.

Adult male red-billed streamertail hummingbirds (Trochilus polytmus) have long tail streamers, but these do not produce their distinctive whirring flight sound. Evidence points to the wings instead – the whirring is synchronised with the wingbeats and video footage shows primary feather eight (P8) bending with each downstroke, creating a gap that produces the fluttering sound.
