= Ben Kilham =

American wildlife rehabilitator

Benjamin Kilham is an American wildlife rehabilitator. He is an expert on the behavior and rehabilitation of American black bears.

== Early life and education ==
Kilham grew up in Lyme, New Hampshire, United States. He is one of five children of Jane, a physician, and Lawrence Kilham, a physician and scientist. As a boy, he developed a passion for the forest and wildlife like his father. The childhood home was filled with books and injured and orphaned animals, including owls, foxes, skunks, woodchucks, and, after his father had a sabbatical in Uganda, a young leopard.

Kilham had an undiagnosed learning disability, later diagnosed as dyslexia. In 1974, he graduated from the University of New Hampshire with a BS in Wildlife.

== Career ==
After college, Kilham found his strengths in mechanics and design made him an excellent gunsmith. He worked at Colt Firearms in West Hartford, Connecticut. His dyslexia prevented him from pursuing a master's degree, which made promotion unlikely. During hard economic times in 1982, Kilham lost his job. He and his wife moved back to New Hampshire. He worked there building and repairing firearms. After his return, he started to rehabilitate sick, injured, and orphaned animals. He tended to skunks, fishers, porcupines, raccoons and, in 1992, his first black bear.

Two Kilham customers, both professors at Dartmouth College, recommended that he look into a program for students with learning disabilities at Dartmouth's Thayer School of Engineering. He took the entrance exam in 1992, earning a score in the top 1 per cent of candidates. He left Thayer to study the biology and behavior of bears. Early in his study, he assumed that most of the work on bears had already been completed. In 1994, he cared for two abandoned bear cubs, and in February 1996, he began caring for three cubs who had been abandoned by their mother after their den was disturbed by logging. He bottle-fed the cubs and made a den next to his bed, made from a basket. He took them for walks in the forest to introduce them to their habitat. He would get on his hands and knees to demonstrate to the cubs what to forage and studied how the bears interacted with the world, including noticing that they used the tips of their tongues to identify new things, consumed fresh deer scat as a digestive aid, and walked with their legs stiff to leave marking points in the ground for other bears to notice. After the cubs were released, one—whom he called "Squirty"—stayed nearby.

Kilham and his wife initially tended to the cubs in the second-floor guest bedroom of their 1812 Federal house in Lyme, New Hampshire. As of 2023, the center has released over six hundred bears. The Center receives cubs from Vermont, New Hampshire, and Massachusetts. Many bears come in as newborn cubs that have been orphaned during late winter, the time of year they and their mothers emerge from their dens. Their mothers may have been incapacitated or killed, and not able to take care of the cubs, who are too young to take care of themselves. When cubs are first brought to the center, they live in the center's indoor enclosure. They are then placed in one of the outside enclosures, where they have time to learn to climb trees and forage. The enclosures feature natural and man-made dens for hibernation in winter. During spring, the bears are fed extra food to improve their outcome once released, which is done by the New Hampshire Fish and Game Department. Currently, Ethan Kilham, Ben Kilham's nephew, is the official caretaker of the bears. He tends to the larger bears at the center, names the cubs, and manages the official Instagram account.

In 2007, Kilham was approached by Drexel University environmental scientist James R. Spotila, who is the cofounder of a nonprofit which develops collaborations with researchers in China. Spotila, in conversations with Chinese researchers, was told that artificially bred giant pandas had difficulty surviving in the wild. Kilham found the pandas living in zoo-like conditions with keepers who were generally afraid of them. He instructed the keepers to treat pandas not as zoo animals, but as sentient beings. The work is featured in the 2018 IMAX documentary Pandas.

In 2008, Kilham was the subject of the National Geographic special titled A Man Among Bears. The program explored his work over the past 12 years, including his efforts to raise Squirty.

In 2015, Kilham got a PhD in environmental sciences from Drexel University. His dissertation was titled "The Social Behavior of American Black Bears." That year, he created a 501c3 nonprofit to oversee the study of the cognitive and social behavior of black bears and to educate the general public about them. Funds were raised to build a reception center which contains a classroom with a large TV which shows live video feeds of bear dens and a timber frame barn to house cubs.

== Awards and honors ==
In 2018, Kilham received the Ellis R. Hatch Jr Award of Excellence from the New Hampshire Fish and Game Commission, the highest honor given by the commission.

== Books ==
- Among the Bears, Raising Orphan Cubs in the Wild (Henry Holt and Co, 2002)
- In the Company of Bears: What Black Bears Have Taught Me about Intelligence and Intuition (Chelsea Green Publishing, 2014)
