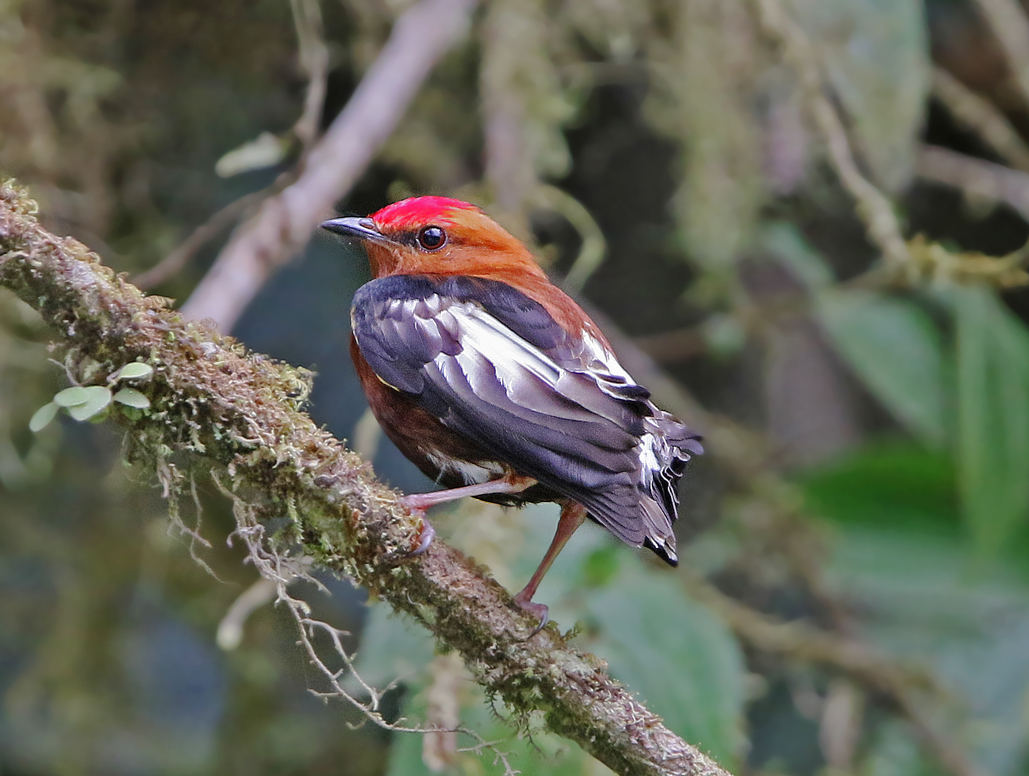
- Male in Bosque Protector Golondrinas, Carchi Province, Ecuador
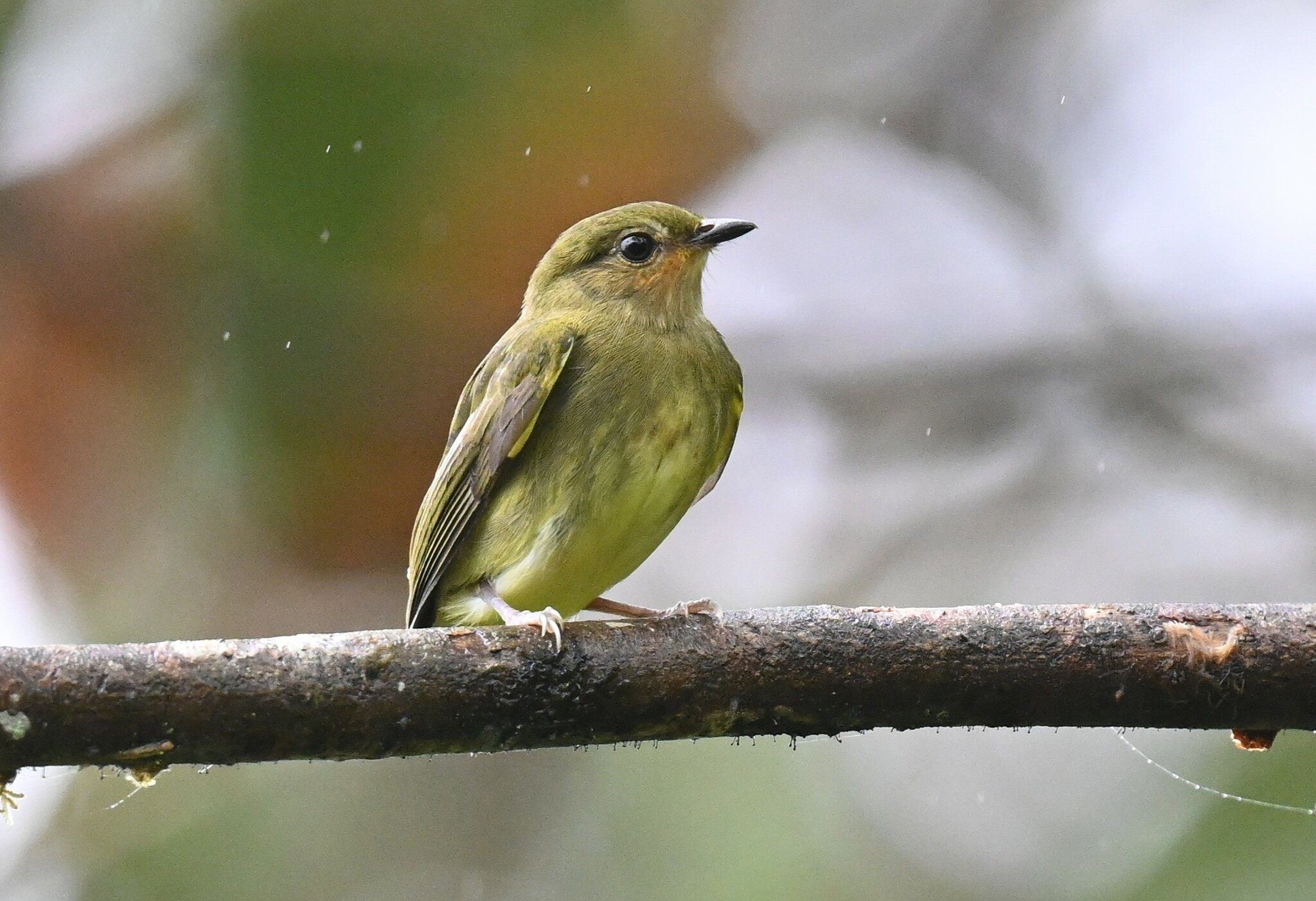
- Female near Quito, Ecuador

Conservation status
- Least Concern (IUCN 3.1)

Scientific classification
- Kingdom: Animalia
- Phylum: Chordata
- Class: Aves
- Order: Passeriformes
- Family: Pipridae
- Genus: Machaeropterus
- Species: M. deliciosus

Binomial name
- Machaeropterus deliciosus (Sclater, PL, 1860)

= Club-winged manakin =

Club-winged Manakin

Species of bird

The club-winged manakin (Machaeropterus deliciosus) is a species of bird in the family Pipridae. It is found in Colombia and Ecuador.

== Taxonomy and systematics ==
The club-winged manakin was originally described in 1860 as Pipra deliciosus. It was later moved to genus Machaeropterus that had been erected in 1854. For a time in the twentieth century it was placed in the monotypic genus Allocotopterus but by the 1980s it reached its current placement.

The club-winged manakin is monotypic.

== Description ==
The club-winged manakin is about 9.5 to 10 cm (3.7 to 3.9 in) long. One female weighed 12 g (0.42 oz). The species is sexually dimorphic. Adult males have a scarlet forehead and crown and a dusky stripe through the eye. The rest of their head and their body are mostly chestnut-brown that is lighter on the face and darker on the belly. Their rump and uppertail coverts are blackish. Their flanks have some white mixed in. Their scapulars and tail are black and their wings black with much white on the flight feathers. Some wing feathers are highly modified as described in the "non-vocal sounds" section below. Adult females have an olive head with a cinnamon tinge on the face, olive upperparts, a whitish throat, yellowish olive breast and flanks, and a pale yellow belly. Both sexes have a dark brown iris, a black bill, and usually grayish pink (sometimes purplish) legs and feet. Juveniles of both sexes resemble adult females.

== Distribution and habitat ==
The club-winged manakin is found on the western slope of the Andes from Risaralda Department in west-central Colombia south into Ecuador to Pichincha Province with small populations also in El Oro and Loja provinces. It inhabits wet montane forest in the subtropical zone and also mature secondary woodland. In Colombia it ranges in elevation between 400 and 1,800 m (1,300 and 5,900 ft) and in Ecuador mostly between 600 and 1,600 m (2,000 and 5,200 ft) but locally lower.

== Behavior ==
=== Movement ===
The club-winged manakin is a year-round resident, though some individuals in Ecuador move to lower elevations outside the breeding season.

=== Feeding ===
The club-winged manakin feeds on small fruits and insects. It takes them from leaves and twigs with short sallies from a perch. It occasionally joins mixed-species feeding flocks.

=== Breeding ===
The club-winged manakin's breeding season has not been fully defined but includes at least March to August in Colombia. Single males display in a lek to females from a thin branch as high as about 7 m (25 ft) above the ground. During the display their wings produce the mechanical sound described below. The species' nest is a small open cup made from plant fibers with moss on the outside, and is typically placed in a branch fork between about 0.5 and 1.2 m (2 and 4 ft) above the ground. The clutch is two eggs. The incubation period, time to fledging, and details of parental care are not known.

=== Vocalization ===
The male club-winged manakins at a lek make "a high-pitched seet or seet-seet followed by up to 8 loud, strident keah! notes".

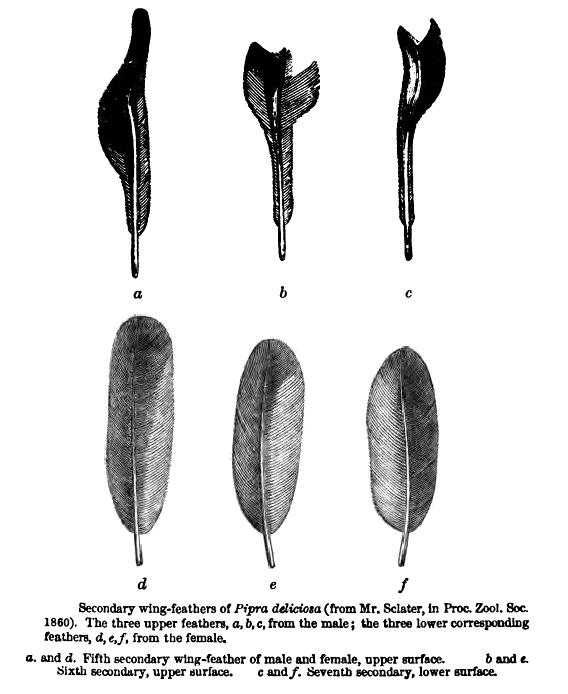
The structures were first noted by P. L. Sclater in 1860, and the sound production adaptations were discussed by Charles Darwin in 1871.

=== Non-vocal sounds ===
Like several other manakins, the club-winged manakin produces a mechanical sound with its extremely modified secondary remiges, an effect known as sonation. The sound has been described as a "tip-tip-beeuwww" whose final note has a ringing quality. The manakins adapted their wings in this odd way as a result of sexual selection. In manakins, the males have evolved adaptations to suit the females' attraction towards sound. Wing sounds in various manakin lineages have evolved independently. Some species pop like a firecracker, and there are a couple that make whooshing noises in flight. The club-winged manakin has the unique ability to produce musical sounds with its wings. Each wing of the club-winged manakin has one feather with a series of at least seven ridges along its central vane. Next to the strangely ridged feather is another feather with a stiff, curved tip. When the bird raises its wings over its back, it shakes them back and forth over 100 times a second (hummingbirds typically flap their wings only 50 times a second). Each time it hits a ridge, the tip produces a sound. The tip strikes each ridge twice: once as the feathers collide, and once as they move apart again. This raking movement allows a wing to produce 14 sounds during each shake. By shaking its wings 100 times a second, the club-winged manakin can produce around 1,400 single sounds during that time. In order to withstand the repeated beating of its wings together, the club-winged manakin has evolved solid wing bones (by comparison, the bones of most birds are hollow, making flight easier). The solid wing bones, a result of sexual selection, are also present in female manakins, who do not benefit from the trait.

While this "spoon-and-washboard" anatomy is a well-known sound-producing apparatus in insects (see stridulation), it had not been well documented in vertebrates (some snakes stridulate too, but they do not have dedicated anatomical features for it).

== Status ==
The IUCN has assessed the club-winged manakin as being of Least Concern. It has a somewhat restricted range; its population size is not known and is believed to be decreasing. No immediate threats have been identified. It is considered uncommon in Colombia and local in Ecuador. It is "[d]ependent on conservation of adequate forest at upper tropical and subtropical levels".
