= Thor Hanson =

American conservation biologist and author

Thor Hanson is an American conservation biologist and author. Hanson has published six books for general audiences and one children's book. He has also contributed to a range of periodicals and other media, including the PBS program, American Spring LIVE.

== Career ==
Hanson received a bachelor's degree from the University of Redlands, a master's degree from the University of Vermont, and a Ph.D. from the University of Idaho. In the 1990s, Hanson worked as a volunteer for the U.S. Peace Corps in Uganda and managed a tourism project regarding brown bears for the U.S. Forest Service. Outside of writing for general audiences, Hanson has also published "technical research on such topics as the ecology of tropical trees, forest fragmentation and its impact on bird nest predation, the impact that warfare can have on biodiversity hotspots, and the behaviour of Neotropical monkeys and birds." Hanson is a Guggenheim Fellow, and in 1998, he also received the Switzer Environmental Fellowship.

== Personal life ==
Hanson lives in the U.S. state of Washington with his wife and son.

== Works ==
=== Books ===
- The Impenetrable Forest: My Gorilla Years in Uganda. 1500 Books, 2008. ISBN 9781933698199.
- Feathers: The Evolution of a Natural Miracle. Basic Books, 2011. ISBN 9780465023462.
- The Triumph of Seeds: How Grains, Nuts, Kernels, Pulses and Pips Conquered the Plant Kingdom and Shaped Human History. Basic Books, 2015. ISBN 9780465048724.
- Buzz: The Nature and Necessity of Bees. Basic Books, 2018. ISBN 9780465052615.
- Hurricane Lizards and Plastic Squid: The Fraught and Fascinating Biology of Climate Change. Basic Books, 2021. ISBN 9781541672420.
- Close to Home: The Wonders of Nature Just Outside Your Door. Basic Books, 2025. ISBN 9781541601246.

=== Children's books ===
- Bartholomew Quill: A Crow's Quest to Know Who's Who. Little Bigfoot/Sasquatch Books, 2016.
