= Franklin Burroughs (author) =

American author of nonfiction

Franklin Burroughs (born March 7, 1942) is an American author of nonfiction.

== Biography ==
Burroughs holds a B.A. in English from Sewanee: The University of the South and a Ph.D. from Harvard University.

He is the Harrison King McCann Research Professor of the English Language Emeritus at Bowdoin College. He retired from teaching in 2002. He writes primarily about the people and natural environments in and around Conway, South Carolina where he was raised, and Bowdoinham, Maine, where he has lived his adult life.

== Awards ==
- National Endowment for the Arts fellowship
- "Compression Wood" was anthologized in The Best American Essays in 1999, edited by Edward Hoagland and Robert Atwan.
- Confluence: Merrymeeting Bay received the 2009 John Burroughs Medal for natural history writing.

== Books ==
- Horry and the Waccamaw (1992). W. W. Norton & Company. ISBN 9780393030839.
- The River Home: A Return to the Carolina Low Country (1998). University of Georgia Press.
- Billy Watson's Croker Sack (1991). University of Georgia Press.
- Confluence: Merrymeeting Bay (2006). Tilbury House Publishers. ISBN 9780884482826.
