= Francis Lee Jaques =

American painter

Francis Lee Jaques (September 28, 1887 – July 24, 1969) was an American wildlife painter.

Jaques hunted and trapped with his father and connected with editors and writers from major hunting magazines. While still a teenager, Jaques paid ten dollars to buy a taxidermy shop in Aitkin, Minnesota. He toughed out a few winters scarcely earning enough money to survive and bartering paintings to pay for services. He alternated railroad work in northern Minnesota and taxidermy in Aitkin to make ends meet.

In 1918, Jaques was drafted into the army. During his six-month stay in St. Emilione, France, he recorded his surroundings in several small pencil drawings and watercolor paintings. He came home with a rank of Private First Class and returned to Duluth, Minnesota. There he met Clarence C. Rosenkranz, an artist of the impressionist style, who helped him mix color and express his feelings through art.

In 1924, Jaques sent some of his paintings to the American Museum of Natural History in New York City. His talent was recognized, and he was invited to join the museum's team as a background painter. The team traveled around the world gathering exhibit specimens. Jaques recorded his experiences throughout.

Jaques was almost 40 years old when he met Florence Page, a friend of his landlord. Three years his junior, she was an aspiring writer who had done graduate work at Columbia University. Page was originally from Decatur, Illinois, and she and Jaques found common ground in nature and developed a friendship. They were married in 1927.

Francis and Florence Page Jaques spent time camping in the Boundary Waters Canoe Area of Minnesota. The time inspired their now-famous books, Snowshoe Country and Canoe Country. Sales from these two books helped fund the Jaqueses' involvement in the conservation project at Susie Island in Lake Superior. The conservation area was later named The Francis Lee Jaques Memorial Preserve in his honor.

The Jaqueses lived in New York City for over 25 years before returning to Minnesota to work at the James Ford Bell Museum of Natural History on the University of Minnesota campus. Jaques worked designing and painting diorama backgrounds until his retirement.

The Jaqueses' final years were spent living in North Oaks, a few miles north of Saint Paul, Minnesota. Jaques painted daily and created a mountainous body of work. Upon his death Florence completed and arranged for publication of his biography, Francis Lee Jaques: Artist of the Wilderness World. She donated his remaining artworks to the James Ford Bell Museum of Natural History in Minneapolis and the Saint Louis County Historical Society, in Duluth, Minnesota. The second largest collection of Jaques art outside of the James Ford Bell Museum is located at the Jaques Art Center (121 2nd Street NW, Aitkin, MN 56431). Besides the permanent displays Jaques Art Center holds annual celebrations of his art that regularly include additional pieces on loan from the James Ford Bell Museum.

Frances Lee Jaques died July 24, 1969, at the age of 81. His wife, Florence Page Jaques, died January 1, 1972, at 82 years of age.

== Partial bibliography ==
Books by Florence Page Jaques – Illustrated by Francis Lee Jaques

- Canoe Country – 1938 – The University of Minnesota Press
- The Geese Fly High – The University of Minnesota Press
- Birds Across The Sky – The University of Minnesota Press
- Snowshoe Country – 1944 – University of Minnesota Press (Awarded 1946 John Burroughs Medal)
- Canadian Spring – 1947 – Harper & Brothers
- As Far As The Yukon – 1951 – Harper & Brothers

== See also ==
- List of wildlife artists
