= Washington State Book Award =

Annual literary award

The Washington State Book Awards is a literary awards program presented annually in recognition of notable books written by Washington authors in the previous year. The program was established in 1967 as the Governor's Writers Awards. Each year, up to ten outstanding books of any genre, which have been written by Washington authors in the previous year are recognized with awards based on literary merit, lasting importance, and overall quality of the publication.

== History ==
When the Governor's Writers Awards was established in 1967, it was based at the Washington State Library in Olympia. In 2001, the Washington Center for the Book based at the Seattle Public Library took over the administration of the program, renaming it as the Washington State Book Awards.

In 2005, an additional category was added to represent children's books. Since established, two children's books are honored each year with the Scandiuzzi Children's Book Awards. One book is honored for picture books, while the other for middle grades and young adults.

In 2006, the Center for the Book divided the entire awards program into categories, significantly reducing the number of awards presented. From 2006 through 2010, the genres of History and Biography formed one category. In 2011, Biography was regrouped with Memoir, while History was regrouped with General Nonfiction. In 2013, the categories encompassed General Nonfiction (History), Biography and Memoir, Fiction, Poetry, and two to four Scandiuzzi Children's Books Awards. From 2020 to 2022, there were five categories for adults (Fiction, Poetry, Biograph/Memoir, Creative Nonfiction and General Nonfiction) and three categories for books for youth (Picture Books, Books for Young Readers, and Young Adult Literature). As of 2023, there are four categories for adults (Creative Nonfiction/Memoir, Fiction, General Nonfiction/Biography, and Poetry) and three for youth (Picture Books, Books for Young Readers, and Young Adult Literature).

In 2017, the Washington Center for the Book became a joint partnership of the Washington State Library and The Seattle Public Library. The Washington State Book Awards continue as a project for the Center for the Book.

== Washington State Book Award winners and finalists ==
=== 2000s ===
Between 2002 and 2004, the award was presented to a group of books rather than to a single winner with a selection of finalists.

Year	Author	Title
2002	Sharon Bertsch McGrayne	Prometheans in the Lab: Chemistry and the Making of the Modern World
2002	Michael Collins	The Keepers of Truth
2002	Chris Crutcher	Whale Talk
2002	Madeline DeFrees	Blue Dusk: New and Selected Poems: 1951-2001
2002	Carole Glickfeld	Swimming Toward the Ocean
2002	Lyanda Lynn Haupt	Rare Encounters with Ordinary Birds: Notes from a Northwest Year
2002	Mira Kamdar	Motiba's Tattoos: A Granddaughter's Journey from America Into Her Indian Family's Past
2002	Carolyn Kizer	Cool, Calm and Collected: Poems, 1960-2000
2002	Duff Wilson	Fateful Harvest: The True Story of a Small Town, a Global Industry, and a Toxic Secret
2002	Robin K. Wright	Northern Haida Master Carvers
2003	Deloris Tarzan Ament	Iridescent Light: The Emergence of Northwest Art
2003	Charles Bergman	Red Delta: Fighting for Life at the End of the Colorado River
2003	Rebecca Brown	Excerpts from a Family Medical Dictionary
2003	Debra Magpie Earling	Perma Red
2003	Deborah Hopkinson	Under the Quilt of Night
2003	Tina Kelley	The Gospel of Galore
2003	Pamela McClusky	Art from Africa: Long Steps Never Broke a Back
2003	Gregory Spatz	Wonderful Tricks: Stories
2003	Indu Sundaresan	The Twentieth Wife
2003	Hill Williams	The Restless Northwest
2004	Gary Atkins	Gay Seattle: Stories of Exile and Belonging
2004	Fred Beckey	Range of Glaciers: The Exploration and Survey of the Northern Cascade Range
2004	Karen Cushman	Rodzina
2004	Chris Forhan	The Actual Moon, the Actual Stars
2004	Alan Gallay	The Indian Slave Trade: The Rise of the English Empire in the American South, 1670-1717
2004	Linda Lawrence Hunt	Bold Spirit: Helga Estby's Forgotten Walk Across Victorian America
2004	Erik Larson	The Devil in the White City
2004	David R. Montgomery	King of Fish: The Thousand-Year Run of Salmon
2004	Jack Nisbet	Visible Bones: Journey Across Time in the Columbia River Country
2004	Matt Ruff	Set This House in Order: A Romance of Souls

In 2005, the Washington State Book Awards were separated into categories, and individual winners were selected.

==== General Books ====
Year	Author	Title	Result
2005	Charles D'Ambrosio	Orphans	Winner
2005	Lesley Hazleton	Mary: A Flesh-and-Blood Biography of the Virgin Mother	Winner
2005	Christopher Howell	Light's Ladder: Poems	Winner
2005	Paul Hunter	Breaking Ground	Winner
2005	Stephanie Kallos	Broken for You	Winner
2005	David Laskin	The Children's Blizzard	Winner
2005	Nikhil Pal Singh	Black Is a Country: Race and the Unfinished Struggle for Democracy	Winner
2005	Peter Ward	Gorgon: The Monsters That Ruled the Planet Before Dinosaurs and How They Died in the Greatest Catastrophe in Earth's History	Winner

==== Scandiuzzi Children's Book Award ====
Year	Category	Author	Title	Result
2005	Middle Grades and Young Adults	Deb Caletti	Honey, Baby, Sweetheart	Winner
2005	Picture Book	Carmela D'Amico, illustrated by Steven D'Amico	Ella the Elegant Elephant	Winner
2006	Middle Grades and Young Adults	Michael Gruber	The Witch's Boy	Winner
2006	Middle Grades and Young Adults	Deb Caletti	Wild Roses	Finalist
2006	Picture Book	Karla Kuskin, illustrated by Betsy Lewin	So, What's It Like to Be a Cat?	Winner
2006	Picture Book	Carole Lexa Schaefer, illustrated by Catherine Stock	The Bora-Bora Dress	Finalist
2007	Middle Grades and Young Adults	Brent Hartinger	Grand & Humble	Winner
2007	Middle Grades and Young Adults	Kirby Larson	Hattie Big Sky	Finalist
2007	Middle Grades and Young Adults	Michele Torrey	Voyage of Plunder	Finalist
2007	Picture Book	Jack Prelutsky, illustrated by Carin Berger	Behold the Bold Umbrellaphant and Other Poems	Winner
2007	Picture Book	Karma Wilson, illustrated by Jack E. Davis	Moose Tracks	Finalist
2008	Middle Grades and Young Adults	Sherman Alexie, illustrated by Ellen Forney	The Absolutely True Diary of a Part-Time Indian	Winner
2008	Picture Book	George Shannon, illustrated by Laura Dronzek	Rabbit's Gift	Winner
2009	Middle Grades and Young Adults	Richard Farr	Emperors of the Ice: A True Story of Disaster in the Antarctic, 1910-13	Winner
2009	Picture Book	Barbara Kerley, illustrated by Edwin Fotheringham	What To Do About Alice? How Alice Roosevelt Broke the Rules, Charmed the World, and Drove Her Father Teddy Crazy!	Winner
2009	Picture Book	Bonny Becker, illustrated by Kady M. Denton	A Visitor for Bear	Honorable mention

==== Fiction ====
Year	Author	Title	Result
2006	Karen Fisher	A Sudden Country	Winner
2006	MacKenzie Bezos	The Testing of Luther Albright	Finalist
2006	Matt Briggs	Shoot the Buffalo	Finalist
2006	Stacey Levine	Frances Johnson	Finalist
2006	Nancy Rawles	My Jim	Finalist
2006	Jess Walter	Citizen Vince	Finalist
2007	Charles D'Ambrosio	The Dead Fish Museum	Winner
2007	David Long	The Inhabited World	Finalist
2007	Ryan Boudinot	The Littlest Hitler: Stories	Finalist
2007	Jess Walter	The Zero	Finalist
2008	Matt Ruff	Bad Monkeys	Winner
2008	Nancy Horan	Loving Frank	Finalist
2008	Alex Mindt	Male of the Species	Finalist
2008	Ann Pancake	Strange as This Weather Has Been	Finalist
2008	Joseph Powell	Fish Grooming and Other Stories	Finalist
2009	Jonathan Evison	All About Lulu	Winner
2009	Dave Boling	Guernica	Finalist
2009	Carol Cassella	Oxygen	Finalist
2009	David Guterson	The Other Alcott	Finalist
2009	Alex Kuo	White Jade and Other Stories	Finalist

==== General Nonfiction ====
Year	Author	Title	Result
2006	John M. Marzluff and Tony Angell	In the Company of Crows and Ravens	Winner
2006	Hugo Kugiya	58 Degrees North	Finalist
2006	James McKean	Home Stand	Finalist
2006	David E. Miller	Toward a New Regionalism	Finalist
2006	Jonathan Raban	My Holy War	Finalist
2007	William D. Layman	River of Memory: The Everlasting Columbia	Finalist
2008	David R. Montgomery	Dirt: the Erosion of Civilizations	Winner
2008	Kathleen Flinn	The Sharper Your Knife, the Less You Cry: Love, Laughter and Tears at the World's Most Famous Cooking School	Finalist
2008	Lesley Hazelton	Jezebel: The Untold Story of the Bible's Harlot Queen	Finalist
2008	Robert D. Morris	The Blue Death: Disease, Disaster and the Water We Drink	Finalist
2008	Robert Michael Pyle	Sky Time in Grays River: Living for Keeps in a Forgotten Place	Finalist
2009	Barbara Brotherton, editor	S'abadeb: The Gifts: Pacific Coast Salish Arts and Artists	Winner
2009	Paul Bannick	The Owl and the Woodpecker: Encounters with North America’s Most Iconic Birds	Finalist
2009	Bruce Barcott	The Last Flight of the Scarlet Macaw: One Woman’s Fight to Save the World’s Most Beautiful Bird	Finalist
2009	Cliff Mass	The Weather of the Pacific Northwest	Finalist
2009	David Shields	The Thing About Life is That One Day You’ll Be Dead	Finalist

==== History/Biography ====
Year	Author	Title	Result
2006	Timothy Egan	The Worst Hard Time: The Untold Story of Those Who Survived the Great American Dust Bowl	Winner
2006	Jack Hamann	On American Soil	Finalist
2006	David Neiwert	Strawberry Days	Finalist
2006	Eric Scigliano	Michelangelo's Mountain	Finalist
2007	Julie Phillips	James Tiptree, Jr.: The Double Life of Alice B. Sheldon	Winner
2007	Daniel James Brown	Under a Flaming Sky: The Great Hinckley Firestorm of 1894	Finalist
2007	Charles R. Cross	Room Full of Mirrors: A Biography of Jimi Hendrix Continent: The Importance of Everything and Other Lessons from Darwin's Lost Notebooks; Joshua Wolf Shenk	Finalist
2007	Lyanda Lynn Haupt	Pilgrim on the Bird: Pilgrim on the Bird Continent: The Importance of Everything and Other Lessons from Darwin's Lost Notebooks	Finalist
2007	Joshua Wolf Shenk	Lincoln's Melancholy: How Depression Challenged a President and Fueled His Greatness	Finalist
2008	Coll Thrush	Native Seattle: Histories from the Crossing-Over Place	Winner
2008	Michael Honey	Going Down Jericho Road: The Memphis Strike, Martin Luther King's Last Campaign	Finalist
2008	Jeffrey Karl Ochsner	Lionel H. Pries, Architect, Artist, Educator: from Arts and Crafts to Modern Architecture	Finalist
2009	Robert Clark	Dark Water: Flood and Redemption in the City of Masterpieces	Winner
2009	Kate Jackson	Mean and Lowly Things: Snakes, Science, and Survival in the Congo	Finalist
2009	Debra Jarvis	It's Not About the Hair: And Other Uncertainties of Life & Cancer	Finalist
2009	Jim Kershner	Carl Maxey: A Fighting Life	Finalist
2009	Richard Scheuermann	Finding Chief Kamiakin: The Life and Legacy of a Northwest Patriot	Finalist

==== Poetry ====
Year	Author	Title	Result
2006	Lucia Perillo	Luck Is Luck	Winner
2006	Lillias Bever	Bellini in Istanbul	Finalist
2006	Linda Bierds	First Hand	Finalist
2006	J.W. Marshall	Taken With	Finalist
2006	Katrina Roberts	The Quick	Finalist
2006	David Wagoner	Good Morning and Good Night	Finalist
2007	Madeline DeFrees	Spectral Waves	Winner
2007	Kathleen Flenniken	Famous	Finalist
2007	Tess Gallagher	Dear Ghosts	Finalist
2007	Jennifer Maier	Dark Alphabet	Finalist
2007	Eric McHenry	Potscrubber Lullabies	Finalist
2008	Samuel Green	The Grace of Necessity	Winner
2008	Marvin Bell	Mars Being Red	Finalist
2008	Mary Cornish	Red Studio	Finalist
2008	Peter Periera	What's Written on the Body	Finalist
2009	David Wagoner	A Map of the Night	Winner
2009	Thomas Aslin	A Moon Over Wings	Finalist
2009	Linda Bierds	Flight: New and Selected Poems	Finalist
2009	D. S. Butterworth	The Radium Watchdial Painters	Finalist
2009	Katrina Roberts	Friendly Fire	Finalist

=== 2010s ===
==== Biography/Memoir ====
Year	Author	Title	Result	Ref.
2011	Doug Merlino	The Hustle: One Team and Ten Lives in Black and White	Winner	
2011	Claire Dederer	Poser: My Life in Twenty-three Yoga Poses	Finalist	
2011	Kurt Hoelting	The Circumference of Home: One Man's Yearlong Quest for A Radically Local Life	Finalist	
2011	Robert Michael Pyle	The Mariposa Road: The First Butterfly Big Year	Finalist	
2011	Ana Maria Spagna	Test Ride on the Sunnyland Bus: A Daughter's Civil Rights Journey	Finalist	
2012	Paul Lindholdt	In Earshot of Water: Notes from the Columbia Plateau	Winner	
2012	Jana Harris	Horses Never Lie About Love: The Heartwarming Story of a Remarkable Horse Who Changed the World Around Her	Finalist	
2012	Shiro Kashiba	Shiro: Wit, Wisdom & Recipes from a Sushi Pioneer	Finalist	
2012	Katherine Malmo	Who In This Room: The Realities of Cancer, Fish, and Demolition	Finalist	
2012	Ana Maria Spagna	Potluck: Community on the Edge of Wilderness	Finalist	
2013	Timothy Egan	Short Nights of the Shadow Catcher: The Epic Life and Immortal Photographs of Edward Curtis	Winner	
2013	Ellen Forney	Marbles: Mania, Depression, Michelangelo & Me	Finalist	
2013	Karl Marlantes	What It Is Like to Go to War	Finalist	
2013	Domingo Martinez	The Boy Kings of Texas	Finalist	
2014	David Laskin	The Family: Three Journeys Into the Heart of the Twentieth Century	Winner	
2014	Peter Bagge	Woman Rebel: The Margaret Sanger Story	Finalist	
2014	Nicole Hardy	Confessions of a Latter-Day Virgin	Finalist	
2014	Jonathan Raban	Driving Home: An American Journey	Finalist	
2015	Charles D’Ambrosio	Loitering: New and Collected Essays	Winner	
2015	Bryce Andrews	Badluck Way: A Year on the Ragged Edge of the West	Finalist	
2015	Kathleen Flinn	Burnt Toast Makes You Sing Good: A Memoir of Food and Love from an American Midwest Family	Finalist	
2015	Tom Robbins	Tibetan Peach Pie: A True Account of an Imaginative Life	Finalist	
2015	Elissa Washuta	My Body Is a Book of Rules	Finalist	
2016	Mark Rozema	Road Trip	Winner	
2016	Sonya Lea	Wondering Who You Are	Finalist	
2016	Michael N. McGregor	Pure Act: The Uncommon Life of Robert Lax	Finalist	
2016	Ana Maria Spagna	Reclaimers	Finalist	
2016	Tara Austen Weaver	Orchard House: How a Neglected Garden Taught One Family to Grow	Finalist	
2017	Brenda Miller	An Earlier Life	Winner	
2017	Susan Marie Conrad	Inside: One Woman's Journey through the Inside Passage	Finalist	
2017	Lindy West	Shrill: Notes from a Loud Woman	Finalist	
2017	Leif Whittaker	My Old Man and the Mountain	Finalist	
2018	Claudia Rowe	The Spider and the Fly	Winner	
2018	Geraldine DeRuiter	All Over the Place: Adventures in Travel, True Love, and Petty Theft	Finalist	
2018	Kristin Jarvis Adams	The Chicken Who Saved Us	Finalist	
2019	Janet Buttenwieser	Guts	Winner	
2019	Sarah Cannon	The Shame of Losing	Finalist	
2019	Kristi Coulter	Nothing Good Can Come from This	Finalist	
2019	Patrick Parr	The Seminarian	Finalist	
2019	Paul Souders	Arctic Solitaire	Finalist	

==== Fiction ====
Year	Author	Title	Result	Ref.
2010	Jim Lynch	Border Songs	Winner	
2010	Ryan Boudinot	Misconception	Finalist	
2010	Pete Dexter	Spooner	Finalist	
2010	Jamie Ford	Hotel on the Corner of Bitter and Sweet	Finalist	
2011	Karl Marlantes	Matterhorn: A Novel of the Vietnam War	Winner	
2011	Susan Froderberg	Old Border Road: A Novel	Finalist	
2011	Valerie Trueblood	Marry or Burn: Stories	Finalist	
2011	Jess Walter	The Financial Lives of the Poets	Finalist	
2011	Carol Wiley Cassella	Healer	Finalist	
2012	Peter Mountford	A Young Man's Guide to Late Capitalism	Winner	
2012	Jonathan Evison	West of Here	Finalist	
2012	David Guterson	Ed King	Finalist	
2012	Stacey Levine	The Girl With Brown Fur: Tales Stories	Finalist	
2012	Melinda Moustakis	Bear Down, Bear North: Alaska Stories	Finalist	
2013	Amanda Coplin	The Orchardist	Winner	
2013	Ryan Boudinot	Blueprints of the Afterlife	Finalist	
2013	Jonathan Evison	The Revised Fundamentals of Caregiving	Finalist	
2013	Lucia Perillo	Happiness Is a Chemical in the Brain	Finalist	
2013	Jess Walter	Beautiful Ruins	Finalist	
2014	Nicola Griffith	Hild	Winner	
2014	Scott Elliott	Temple Grove	Finalist	
2014	Gregory Spatz	Half as Happy	Finalist	
2014	Jess Walter	We Live in Water	Finalist	
2014	Lance Weller	Wilderness	Finalist	
2015	Bruce Holbert	The Hour of Lead	Winner	
2015	Heather Brittain Bergstrom	Steal the North	Finalist	
2015	Adrianne Harun	A Man Came Out of a Door in the Mountain	Finalist	
2015	Martin Limón	The Iron Sickle	Finalist	
2015	Peter Mountford	The Dismal Science	Finalist	
2016	Sharma Shields	The Sasquatch Hunter's Almanac	Winner	
2016	S.M. Hulse	Black River	Finalist	
2016	Stephanie Kallos	RT	Finalist	
2016	Shann Ray	American Copper	Finalist	
2017	Shawn Vestal	Daredevils	Winner	
2017	Laurie Blauner	The Solace of Monsters	Finalist	
2017	Ted Chiang	Stories of Your Life and Others	Finalist	
2017	Annie Proulx	Barkskins, Matt Ruff, Lovecraft Country	Finalist	
2018	Laurie Frankel	This Is How It Always Is	Winner	
2018	Laura Anne Gilman	The Cold Eye	Finalist	
2018	Elise Hooper	The Other Alcott	Finalist	
2018	Matthew D. Hunt	Solar Reboot	Finalist	
2018	Nancy Pearl	George and Lizzie	Finalist	
2018	Ingrid Thoft	Duplicity	Finalist	
2019	Nicola Griffith	So Lucky	Winner	
2019	Katrina Carrasco	The Best Bad Things	Finalist	
2019	Kim Fu	The Lost Girls of Camp Forevermore	Finalist	
2019	Charles Johnson	Night Hawks	Finalist	
2019	Robin Oliveira	Winter Sisters	Finalist	

==== General Nonfiction ====
Year	Author	Title	Results	Ref.
2010	Carol Kaesuk Yoon	Naming Nature: The Clash Between Instinct and Science	Winner	
2010	Tony Angell	Puget Sound Through an Artist's Eye	Finalist	
2010	Lyanda Lynn Haupt	Crow Planet: Essential Wisdom from the Urban Wilderness	Finalist	
2010	Brenda Miller	Blessing of the Animals	Finalist	
2010	David Williams	Stories in Stone: Travels Through Urban Geology	Finalist	

==== History/Biography ====
Year	Author	Title	Result	Ref.
2010	Timothy Egan	The Big Burn: Teddy Roosevelt and the Fire That Saved America	Winner	
2010	Daniel James Brown	The Indifferent Stars Above: The Harrowing Saga of a Donner Party Bride	Finalist	
2010	Lynda Mapes	Breaking Ground: The Lower Elwha Klallam Tribe and Unearthing of Tse-whit-zen Village	Finalist	
2010	Jack Nisbet	The Collector: David Douglas and the Natural History of the Northwest	Finalist	
2010	Mishna Wolff	I'm Down: A Memoir	Finalist	

==== History/General nonfiction ====
Year	Author	Title	Result	Ref.
2011	David Laskin	The Long Way Home: An American Journey from Ellis Island to the Great War	Winner	
2011	Thea Cooper	Breakthrough: Elizabeth Hughes, the Discovery of Insulin, and the Making of A Medical Miracle	Finalist	
2011	Frances McCue	The Car That Brought You Here Still Runs: Revisiting the Northwest Towns of Richard Hugo	Finalist	
2011	David Shields	Reality Hunger: A Manifesto	Finalist	
2011	Craig Welch	Shell Games: Rogues, Smugglers, and the Hunt for Nature's Bounty	Finalist	
2012	Erik Larson	In the Garden of Beasts: Love, Terror, and an American Family in Hitler's Berlin	Winner	
2012	Stephanie Coontz	A Strange Stirring: The Feminine Mystique and American Women at the Dawn of the 1960s	Finalist	
2012	Jeff Crane	Finding the River: An Environmental History of the Elwha	Finalist	
2012	John Findlay and Bruce Hevly	Atomic Frontier Days: Hanford and the American West	Finalist	
2012	Thor Hanson	Feathers: The Evolution of a Natural Miracle	Finalist	
2013	David R. Montgomery	The Rocks Don't Lie: A Geologist Investigates Noah's Flood	Winner	
2013	Kirsten Grind	The Lost Bank: The Story of the Biggest Bank Failure in American History	Finalist	
2013	Blaine Harden	Escape from Camp 14: One Man's Remarkable Odyssey from North Korea to Freedom in the West	Finalist	
2013	Jack Nisbet	David Douglas, A Naturalist at Work: An Illustrated Exploration Across Two Centuries in the Pacific Northwest	Finalist	
2013	Douglas Smith	Former People: The Final Days of the Russian Aristocracy	Finalist	
2014	Daniel James Brown	The Boys in the Boat: Nine Americans and Their Epic Quest for Gold at the 1936 Berlin Olympics	Winner	
2014	Nancy Bartley	The Boy Who Shot the Sheriff: The Redemption of Herbert Niccolls, Jr.	Finalist	
2014	Langdon Cook	The Mushroom Hunters: On the Trail of an Underground America	Finalist	
2014	David Moskowitz	Wolves in the Land of Salmon	Finalist	
2015	Justin Wadland	Trying Home: The Rise and Fall of an Anarchist Utopia on Puget Sound	Winner	
2015	Greg Atkinson	In Season: Culinary Adventures of a Pacific Northwest Chef	Finalist	
2015	William Dietrich	The North Cascades: Finding Beauty and Renewal in the Wild Nearby	Finalist	
2015	Greg Gordon	When Money Grew on Trees: A.B. Hammond and the Age of the Timber Baron	Finalist	
2015	Frances McCue	Mary Randlett Portraits	Finalist	
2016	Erik Larson	Dead Wake: The Last Crossing of the Lusitania	Winner	
2016	Thor Hanson	The Triumph of Seeds	Finalist	
2016	Ruth Kirk	Ozette: Excavating a Makah Whaling Village	Finalist	
2016	David Neiwert	Of Orcas and Men: What Killer Whales Can Teach Us	Finalist	
2016	Jack Nisbet	Ancient Places: People and Landscape in the Emerging Northwest	Finalist	
2017	Steve Olson	Eruption: The Untold Story of Mount St. Helens	Winner	
2017	Timothy Egan	The Immortal Irishman	Finalist	
2017	Eli Sanders	While the City Slept: A Love Lost to Violence and a Young Man's Descent into Madness	Finalist	
2017	Adrienne Ross Scanlan	Turning Homeward: Restoring Hope and Nature in the Urban Wild	Finalist	
2017	Margaret Willson	Seawomen of Iceland: Survival on the Edge	Finalist	
2018	Lyanda Lynn Haupt	Mozart's Starling	Winner	
2018	Various authors, curated and edited by Jaimee Garbacik	Ghosts of Seattle Past	Finalist	
2018	Langdon Cook	Upstream: Searching for Wild Salmon, from River to Table	Finalist	
2018	David R. Montgomery	Growing a Revolution: Bringing Our Soil to Life	Finalist	
2018	Jonathan White	Tides: The Science and Spirit of the Ocean	Finalist	
2018	David B. Williams and Jennifer Ott	Waterway: The Story of Seattle's Locks and Ship Canal	Finalist	
2019	Ijeoma Oluo	So You Want to Talk About Race	Winner	
2019	Ken Armstrong	A False Report	Finalist	
2019	Paige Embry	Our Native Bees	Finalist	
2019	Angela Garbes	Like a Mother	Finalist	
2019	Ana Maria Spagna	Uplake	Finalist	
2019	Nathan Vass	The Lines That Make Us: Stories from Nathan’s Bus	Finalist	

==== Poetry ====
Year	Author	Title	Result	Ref.
2010	Lucia Perillo	Inseminating the Elephant	Winner	
2010	Sherman Alexie	Face	Finalist	
2010	Shirley Kaufman	Ezekiel's Wheels	Finalist	
2010	Tod Marshall	The Tangled Line	Finalist	
2010	Heather McHugh	Upgraded to Serious	Finalist	
2010	Judith Skillman	Prisoner of the Swifts	Finalist	
2011	Frances McCue	The Bled: Poems	Winner	
2011	Kelli Russell Agodon	Letters from the Emily Dickinson Room	Finalist	
2011	Don Mee Choi	The Morning News Is Exciting	Finalist	
2011	Oliver de la Paz	Personal website	Finalist	
2011	Susan Rich	The Alchemist's Kitchen	Finalist	
2012	Christine Deavel	Woodnote	Winner	
2012	Arlene Kim	What Have You Done to Our Ears to Make Us Hear Echoes?	Finalist	
2012	Katrina Roberts	Underdog	Finalist	
2012	Martha Silano	The Little Office of the Immaculate Conception	Finalist	
2013	Kathleen Flenniken	Plume	Winner	
2013	Bruce Beasley	Theophobia	Finalist	
2013	Andrew Feld	Raptor	Finalist	
2013	Colleen McElroy	Here I Throw Down My Heart	Finalist	
2013	Claire McQuerry	Lacemakers	Finalist	
2014	Ed Skoog	Rough Day	Winner	
2014	Sherman Alexie	What I've Stolen, What I've Earned	Finalist	
2014	Rebecca Hoogs	Self-Storage	Finalist	
2014	Derek Sheffield	Through the Second Skin	Finalist	
2014	Nance van Ninckel	Pacific Walkers	Finalist	
2015	Tod Marshall	Bugle	Winner	
2015	Red Pine (trans.)	The Mountain Poems of Stonehouse	Winner	
2015	Kelli Russell Agodon	Hourglass Museum	Finalist	
2015	Kim-An Lieberman	In Orbit	Finalist	
2016	Carl Phillips	Reconnaissance	Winner	
2016	Rob Carney	88 Maps	Finalist	
2016	Laura Da'	Tributaries	Finalist	
2016	Emily Johnston	Her Animals	Finalist	
2016	Christina Stoddard	Hive	Finalist	
2017	Tara Hardy	My, My, My, My, My	Winner	
2017	Don Mee Choi	Hardly War	Finalist	
2017	Paisley Rekdal	Imaginary Vessels	Finalist	
2017	Michael Schmeltzer	Blood Song	Finalist	
2017	Megan Snyder-Camp	Wintering	Finalist	
2018	Lena Khalaf Tuffaha	Water & Salt	Winner	
2018	Claudia Castro Luna	Killing Marias: A Poem for Multiple Voices	Finalist	
2018	Glenna Cook	Thresholds	Finalist	
2018	Frances McCue	Timber Curtain	Finalist	
2018	Melinda Mueller	Mary's Dust	Finalist	
2018	Eugenia Toledo with Carolyne Wright (trans.)	Trazas de mapa, trazas de sangre / Map Traces, Blood Traces	Finalist	
2019	Laura Da’	Instruments of the True Measure	Winner	
2019	Michele Bombardier	What We Do	Finalist	
2019	Lorraine Ferra	Between Darkness and Trust	Finalist	
2019	Sierra Golden	The Slow Art	Finalist	
2019	Rob Carney	The Book of Sharks	Finalist	

==== Scandiuzzi Children's Book Award ====
Year	Category	Author	Title	Result	Ref.
2010	Early Readers	Bonny Becker	The Magical Ms. Plum	Winner	
2010	Middle Grades and Young Adults	Michael Harmon	Brutal	Winner	
2010	Picture Book	Samantha Vamos with Santiago Cohen (illus.)	Before You Were Here, Mi Amor	Winner	
2011	Early Readers	Patrick Jennings	Guinea Dog	Winner	
2011	Middle Grades and Young Adults	Lish McBride	Hold Me Closer, Necromancer	Winner	
2011	Picture Book	Erik Brooks	Polar Opposites	Winner	
2012	Middle Grades and Young Adults	Katherine Schlick Noe	Something to Hold	Winner	
2012	Picture Book	Nikki McClure	To Market, To Market	Winner	
2013	Picture Book	Barbara Kerley	Those Rebels, John & Tom	Winner	
2013	Young Adult	J. Anderson Coats	The Wicked and the Just	Winner	
2014	Early Readers	M.H. Clark	And Then, Story Starters	Winner	
2014	Middle Readers	Suzanne Selfors	The Sasquatch Escape	Winner	
2014	Picture Book	Kobi Yamada with Mae Besom (illus.)	What Do You Do With an Idea?	Winner	
2014	Picture Book	Brenda Guiberson with Gennady Spirin (illustrator)	Frog Song	Finalist	
2014	Picture Book	Nina Laden with Renata Liwska (illustrator)	Once Upon a Memory	Finalist	
2014	Picture Book	Jack Prelutsky with Carin Berger (illustrator)	Stardines Swim High Across the Sky and Other Poems	Finalist	
2014	Picture Book	George Shannon with Julie Paschkis (illustrator)	Who Put the Cookies in the Cookie Jar?	Finalist	
2014	Young Adult	Patrick Flores-Scott	Jumped In	Winner	
2014	Young Adult	Steven Arntson	The Wrap-Up List	Finalist	
2014	Young Adult	Sean Beaudoin	Wise Young Fool	Finalist	
2014	Young Adult	Thatcher Heldring	The League	Finalist	
2014	Young Adult	Kirby Larson	Duke	Finalist	
2015	Middle Readers	Dana Simpson	Phoebe and Her Unicorn: A Heavenly Nostrils Chronicle	Winner	
2015	Middle Readers	Ken Jennings	Ken Jennings’ Junior Genius Guides: Maps and Geography	Finalist	
2015	Middle Readers	Maureen McQuerry	Beyond the Door	Finalist	
2015	Picture Book	Jennifer K. Mann	Two Speckled Eggs	Winner	
2015	Picture Book	Keith Baker	Little Green Peas: A Big Book of Color	Finalist	
2015	Picture Book	George Shannon with Taeeun Yoo (illus.)	Hands Say Love	Finalist	
2015	Picture Book	Hannah Viano	S Is for Salmon: A Pacific Northwest Alphabet	Finalist	
2015	Young Adult	Leslye Walton	The Strange and Beautiful Sorrows of Ava Lavender	Winner	
2015	Young Adult	Mary Cronk Farrell	Pure Grit: How American World War II Nurses Survived Battle and Prison Camp in the Pacific	Finalist	
2015	Young Adult	Katherine Kirkpatrick	Between Two Worlds	Finalist	
2015	Young Adult	Jennifer Longo	Six Feet Over It	Finalist	
2016	Early Readers	Deborah Underwood	Here Comes the Tooth Fairy Cat	Winner	
2016	Early Readers	Kelly Jones	Unusual Chickens for the Exceptional Poultry Farmer	Finalist	
2016	Middle Readers	A.L. Sonnichsen	Red Butterfly	Winner	
2016	Middle Readers	Beth Hautala	Waiting for Unicorns	Finalist	
2016	Picture Book	Jessixa Bagley	Boats for Papa	Winner	
2016	Picture Book	Lisa Mantchev	Strictly No Elephants	Finalist	
2016	Picture Book	Laurie Thompson	Emmanuel's Dream: The True Story of Emmanuel Ofosu Yeboah	Finalist	
2016	Young Adult	Martha Brockenbrough	The Game of Love and Death	Winner	
2016	Young Adult	Carolyn Lee Adams	Ruthless	Finalist	
2019	Middle Grade	Ben Guterson	Winterhouse	Winner	
2019	Middle Grade	Beth Hautala	The Ostrich and Other Lost Things	Finalist	
2019	Middle Grade	Dav Pilkey	Dog Man: Lord of the Fleas	Finalist	
2019	Middle Grade	Suzanne Selfors	Wish Upon a Sleepover	Finalist	
2019	Picture Books	Alexandra Penfold with Suzanne Kaufman (illus.)	All Are Welcome	Winner	
2019	Picture Books	Jim Averbeck with Amy Hevron (illus)	Trevor	Finalist	
2019	Picture Books	Bonny Becker with Mark Fearing (illus.)	The Frightful Ride of Michael McMichael	Finalist	
2019	Picture Books	Marcy Campbell with Corinna Luyken (illus.)	Adrian Simcox Does NOT Have a Horse	Finalist	
2019	Picture Books	Blake Liliane Hellman with Steven Henry (illus.)	Something Smells	Finalist	
2019	Picture Books	Rubin Pfeffer with Mike Austin (illus.)	Summer Supper	Finalist	
2019	Young Adult	Joy McCullough	Blood Water Paint	Winner	
2019	Young Adult	Martha Brockenbrough	Unpresidented	Finalist	
2019	Young Adult	Deb Caletti	A Heart in a Body in the World	Finalist	
2019	Young Adult	Kate Alice Marshall	I Am Still Alive	Finalist	
2019	Young Adult	David Patneaude	Fast Backward	Finalist	
2019	Young Adult	Leslye Walton	The Price Guide to the Occult	Finalist	
2019	Young Readers	Ben Clanton	Peanut Butter and Jelly	Winner	
2019	Young Readers	Dori Hillestad Butler	King & Kayla and the Case of the Lost Tooth	Finalist	
2019	Young Readers	Crix Sheridan	The Sasquatch and the Lumberjack	Finalist	

=== 2020s ===
==== Biography/Memoir (See General Nonfiction/Biography or Creative Nonfiction/Memoir from 2023) ====
Year	Author	Title	Result	Ref.
2020	Aaron Bobrow-Strain	The Death and Life of Aida Hernandez: A Border Story	Winner	
2020	Gina Siciliano	I Know What I Am: The Life and Times of Artemisia Gentileschi	Finalists	
2020	Julie Tate-Libby	The Good Way: A Himalayan Journey	Finalists	
2020	Jeff Smoot	Hangdog Days: Conflict, Change, and the Race for 5.14	Finalists	
2020	Paula Becker	A House on Stilts: Mothering in the Age of Opioid Addiction	Finalists	
2021	E.J. Koh	The Magical Language of Others	Winner	
2021	Erica Bauermeister	House Lessons: Renovating a Life	Finalists	
2021	Molly Wizenberg	The Fixed Stars	Finalists	
2021	Erica C. Barnett	Quitter: A Memoir of Drinking, Relapse, and Recovery	Finalists	
2022	Elsa Sjunneson	Being Seen: One Deafblind Woman's Fight to End Ableism	Winner	
2022	Jennifer Berney	The Other Mothers: Two Women's Journey to Find the Family That Was Always Theirs	Finalists	
2022	Anne Liu Kellor	Heart Radical: A Search for Language, Love, and Belonging	Finalists	
2022	Carol Smith	Crossing the River: Seven Stories That Saved My Life	Finalists	

In 2023, this category was split up and merged with two others: Biography joined General Nonfiction to become General Nonfiction/Biography, and Memoir joined Creative Nonfiction to become Creative Nonfiction/Memoir.

==== Creative Nonfiction (Creative Nonfiction/Memoir from 2023) ====
In 2023, this category was expanded from Creative Nonfiction to become Creative Nonfiction/Memoir.

Year	Author	Title	Result	Ref.
2020	Eric Liu	Become America: Civic Sermons on Love, Responsibility, and Democracy	Winner	
2020	Briallen Hopper	Hard to Love: Essays and Confessions	Finalists	
2020	Lindy West	The Witches Are Coming	Finalists	
2020	Tiffany Midge	Bury My Heart at Chuck E. Cheese's	Finalists	
2020	Elissa Washuta and Theresa Warburton	Shapes of Native Nonfiction: Collected Essays by Contemporary Writers	Finalists	
2021	Clyde Ford	Think Black	Winner	
2021	Natasha Marin, curator	Black Imagination: Black Voices on Black Futures	Finalists	
2021	Kelly Brenner	Nature Obscura: A City's Hidden Natural World	Finalists	
2021	Kristen Millares Young	Seismic: Seattle, City of Literature edited	Finalists	
2021	Charles Bergman	Every Penguin in the World: A Quest to See Them All	Finalists	
2022	Kate Lebo	The Book of Difficult Fruit: Arguments for the Tart, Tender, and Unruly (with recipes)	Winner	
2022	Frank Abe, Tamiko Nimura, art by Ross Ishikawa, Matt Sasaki	We Hereby Refuse: Japanese American Resistance to Wartime Incarceration	Finalists	
2022	Marcus Harrison Green	Readying to Rise: Essays	Finalists	
2022	Lyanda Lynn Haupt	Rooted: Life at the Crossroads of Science, Nature, and Spirit	Finalists	
2022	Elissa Washuta	White Magic: Essays	Finalists	
2023	Sasha taqʷšəblu LaPointe	Red Paint: The Ancestral Autobiography of a Coast Salish Punk	Winner	
2023	Putsata Reang	Ma and Me: A Memoir	Finalists	
2023	Mickey Rowe	Fearlessly Different	Finalists	
2023	Janet Yoder	Where the Language Lives: Vi Hilbert and the Gift of Lushootseed	Finalists	
2024	Jane Wong	Meet Me Tonight in Atlantic City	Winner	
2024	Claire Dederer	Monsters: A Fan's Dilemma	Finalists	
2024	Sadie Hartmann	101 Horror Books to Read Before You're Murdered	Finalists	
2024	Lauren Kay Johnson	The Fine Art of Camouflage	Finalists	
2024	Mattilda Bernstein Sycamore	Touching the Art	Finalists	
2024	Josh Tuininga	We Are Not Strangers	Finalists	
2025	Tessa Hulls	Feeding Ghosts: A Graphic Memoir	Winner	
2025	Lawrence Ingrassia	A Fatal Inheritance: How a Family Misfortune Revealed a Deadly Medical Mystery	Finalists	
2025	Susan Lieu	The Manicurist’s Daughter: A Memoir	Finalists	
2025	Steve Duda	River Songs: Moments of Wild Wonder in Fly Fishing	Finalists	
2025	Sasha taqʷšəblu LaPointe	Thunder Song: Essays	Finalists	
2025	Simone Gorrindo	The Wives	Finalists	

==== Fiction ====
Year	Author	Title	Result
2020	Karl Marlantes	Deep River	Winner
2020	Madeline ffitch	Stay and Fight	Finalists
2020	Kira Jane Buxton	Hollow Kingdom	Finalists
2020	G. Willow Wilson	The Bird King	Finalists
2020	Sharma Shields	The Cassandra	Finalists
2020	Olivia Hawker	One for the Blackbird, One for the Crow	Finalists
2021	Jess Walter	The Cold Millions	Winner
2021	Donna Miscolta	Living Color: Angie Rubio Stories	Finalists
2021	Olivia Waite	The Care and Feeding of Waspish Widows	Finalists
2021	Melissa Anne Peterson	Vera Violet	Finalists
2021	Alma Alexander	The Second Star	Finalists
2022	E. Lily Yu	On Fragile Waves	Winner
2022	Jonathan Evison	Legends of the North Cascades	Finalists
2022	Laurie Frankel	One Two Three	Finalists
2022	Rachel Lynn Solomon	The Ex Talk	Finalists
2022	JoAnne Tompkins	What Comes After	Finalists
2023	Kim Fu	Lesser Known Monsters of the 21st Century	Winner
2023	Travis Baldree	Legends & Lattes	Finalists
2023	Alli Frank and Asha Youmans	Never Meant to Meet You	Finalists
2023	David Guterson	The Final Case	Finalists
2023	Jess Walter	The Angel of Rome and Other Stories	Finalists
2024	Sonora Jha	The Laughter	Winner
2024	Travis Baldree	Bookshops & Bonedust	Finalists
2024	E. J. Koh	The Liberators	Finalists
2024	Robert Lashley	I Never Dreamed You'd Leave in Summer	Finalists
2024	Dominic Smith	Return to Valetto	Finalists
2024	E. Lily Yu	Jewel Box: Stories	Finalists
2025	Katrina Carrasco	Rough Trade	Winner
2025	Elaine U. Cho	Ocean’s Godori	Finalists
2025	Jennifer Gold	Polite Calamities	Finalists
2025	Samantha Allen	Roland Rogers Isn’t Dead Yet	Finalists
2025	Jared Pechaček	The West Passage	Finalists
2025	Kristin Hannah	The Women	Finalists

==== General Nonfiction (General Nonfiction/Biography from 2023) ====
In 2023, this category was expanded from General Nonfiction to become General Nonfiction/Biography.

Year	Author	Title	Result
2020	Chris Linder, text by Eric Scigliano, with Dr. Robert Max Holmes, Dr. Susan Natali, and Dr. John Schade	The Big Thaw: Ancient Carbon, Modern Science, and a Race to Save the World	Winner
2020	Anu Taranath, illustrated by Ronald Otts Bolisay	Beyond Guilt Trips: Mindful Travel in an Unequal World	Finalists
2020	Jennifer Ott	Olmsted in Seattle: Creating a Park System for a Modern City	Finalists
2020	Susanna Ryan	Seattle Walk Report: An Illustrated Walking Tour through 23 Seattle Neighborhoods	Finalists
2020	Museum of History & Industry and Clara Berg	Seattle Style: High Fashion/High Function	Finalists
2021	Jennifer Haupt	Alone Together: Love, Grief, and Comfort in the Time of COVID-19 edited	Winner
2021	Dean Spade	Mutual Aid: Building Solidarity During the Crisis (and the Next)	Finalists
2021	Steve Olson	The Apocalypse Factory: Plutonium and the Making of the Atomic Age	Finalists
2021	Emily Levesque	The Last Stargazers: The Enduring Story of Astronomy’s Vanishing Explorers	Finalists
2021	Cassandra Tate	Unsettled Ground: The Whitman Massacre and Its Shifting Legacy in the American West	Finalists
2021	Lauren Ko	Pieometry: Modern Tart Art and Pie Design for the Eye and the Palate	Finalists
2022	Lynda Mapes	Orca: Shared Waters, Shared Home	Winner
2022	Trevor James Bond	Coming Home to Nez Perce Country: The Niimíipuu Campaign to Repatriate Their Exploited Heritage	Finalists
2022	Daniel James Brown	Facing the Mountain: A True Story of Japanese American Heroes in World War II	Finalists
2022	Mike Gastineau	Fear No Man: Don James, the '91 Huskies, and the Seven-Year Quest for a National Football Championship	Finalists
2022	Blaine Hardin	Murder at the Mission: A Frontier Killing, Its Legacy of Lies, and the Taking of the American	Finalists
2022	Josephine Ensign	Skid Road: On the Frontier of Health and Homelessness in an American City	Finalists
2023	J. Kenji López-Alt	The Wok: Recipes and Techniques	Winner
2023	Mónica Guzmán	I Never Thought of It That Way: How to Have Fearlessly Curious Conversations in Dangerously Divided Times	Finalists
2023	Rena Priest	Northwest Know-How: Beaches	Finalists
2023	Clyde W. Ford	Of Blood and Sweat: Black Lives and the Making of White Power and Wealth	Finalists
2023	William Alexander	Ten Tomatoes that Changed the World: A History	Finalists
2024	Timothy Egan	A Fever in the Heartland: The Ku Klux Klan's Plot to Take Over America, and the Woman Who Stopped Them	Winner
2024	Tom Fuculoro	Biking Uphill in the Rain: The Story of Seattle from Behind the Handlebars	Finalists
2024	Matika Wilbur	Project 562: Changing the Way We See Native America	Finalists
2024	Tim McNulty	Salmon, Cedar, Rock & Rain: Washington's Olympic Peninsula	Finalists
2024	Peter Blecha	Stomp and Shout: R&B and the Origins of Northwest Rock and Roll	Finalists
2024	Shannon Cram	Unmaking the Bomb: Environmental Cleanup and the Politics of Impossibility	Finalists
2025	Ijeoma Oluo	Be A Revolution	Winner
2025	David Moskowitz	Big River: Resilience and Renewal in the Columbia Basin	Finalists
2025	Ashley Rodriguez	Field Notes from a Fungi Forager	Finalists
2025	Seth Zuckerman & Kirk Hanson	A Forest of Your Own: The Pacific Northwest Handbook of Ecological Forestry	Finalists
2025	Lynne Peeples	The Inner Clock: Living in Sync with Our Circadian Rhythms	Finalists
2025	Anna Letitia Zivarts	When Driving Is Not an Option: Steering Away from Car Dependency	Finalists

==== Picture Books ====
Year	Author	Title	Result	Ref.
2020	Bridget Beth Collins	Flora Forager ABC	Winner	
2020	Kevan Atteberry	Ghost Cat	Finalists	
2020	Caroline Wright, illustrated by Willow Heath	Lasting Love	Finalists	
2021	Jennifer K. Mann	The Camping Trip	Winner	
2021	Toni Yuly	Play Day School Day	Finalists	
2021	Corey Tabor	Snail Crossing	Finalists	
2021	Martha Brockenbrough, illustrated by Gabriel Alborozo	This Old Dog	Finalists	
2021	Amanda Abler, illustrated by Levi Hastings	The Spirit of Springer	Finalists	
2022	Jennifer Bradbury with Sam Boughton (illus.)	Rock by Rock: The Fantastical Garden of Nek Chand	Winner	
2022	Marcy Campbell with Corinna Luyken (illus.)	Something Good	Finalists	
2022	Nikki McClure	1, 2, 3 Salish Sea: A Pacific Northwest Counting Book	Finalists	
2022	Julie Paschkis	The Barking Ballad: A Bark-along, Meow-along Book	Finalists	
2023	Ellie Peterson	How to Hug a Pufferfish	Winner	
2023	Rob Albanese	The Birders: An Unexpected Encounter in the Northwest Woods	Finalists	
2023	Tom Crestodina	Working Boats: An Inside Look at Ten Amazing Watercraft	Finalists	
2023	Nikki McClure	Old Wood Boat	Finalists	
2024	Ben Clanton and Andy Chou Musser	Ploof	Winner	
2024	Jessixa Bagley	Maurice	Finalists	
2024	Tom Brenner with Jenn Hill (illus.)	And Then Comes School	Finalists	
2024	Kate Hoefler with Corinna Luyken (illus.)	In the Dark	Finalists	
2024	Joy McCullough	The Story of a Book	Finalists	
2024	Michaele Razi	Drake the Super-Excited, Overeager, In-Your-Face Snake	Finalists	
2025	Belen Medina with Natalia Rojas Castro (illus.)	Daughter of the Light-Footed People	Winner	
2025	Lynn Brunelle with Julia Patton (illus.)	Haiku, Ew!: Celebrating the Disgusting Side of Nature	Finalists	
2025	Corey Tabor	Fox, Fox, and More Fox: Three Stories	Finalists	
2025	Amy Hevron	Log Life	Finalists	
2025	Nina Laden with Melissa Castrillon (illus.)	Love Is My Favorite Color	Finalists	
2025	Quinn Miller Murphy with Jillian Thalman (illus.)	What Did My Ancestors Eat?	Finalists	

==== Poetry ====
Year	Author	Title	Result	Ref.
2020	Paisley Rekdal	Nightingale	Winner	
2020	Keetje Kuipers	All Its Charms	Finalists	
2020	David Guterson, illustrated by Justin Gibbens	Turn Around Time: A Walking Poem for the Pacific Northwest	Finalists	
2020	Abby E. Murray	Hail and Farewell	Finalists	
2020	Francesca Bell	Bright Stain	Finalists	
2021	Phoebe Bosché, Anna Bálint, and Thomas Hubbard (editors)	Take a Stand: Art Against Hate, a Raven Chronicles Anthology	Winner	
2021	Don Mee Choi	DMZ Colony	Finalists	
2021	Jessica Gigot	Feeding Hour	Finalists	
2021	Kathleen Flenniken	Post Romantic	Finalists	
2021	Gina Hietpas	Terrain	Finalists	
2021	Ebo Barton	Insubordinate	Finalists	
2022	Sharon Hashimoto	More American	Winner	
2022	Kelli Russell Agodon	Dialogues with Rising Tides	Finalists	
2022	Andrew Robin	Stray Birds	Finalists	
2022	Kathryn Smith	Self-Portrait with Cephalopod	Finalists	
2022	Gary Thompson	Broken by Water: Salish Sea Years	Finalists	
2023	Ricardo Ruiz	We Had Our Reasons: Poems by Ricardo Ruiz and Other Hardworking Mexicans from Eastern Washington	Winner	
2023	Paul Hlava Ceballos	banana [ ]	Finalists	
2023	Claudia Castro Luna	Cipota Under the Moon	Finalists	
2023	Hannah Lee Jones	When I Was the Wind	Finalists	
2023	Caitlin Scarano	The Necessity of Wildfire	Finalists	
2023	Scott Oki	Contemplations	Finalists	
2024	Rena Priest	I Sing the Salmon Home: Poems from Washington State	Winner	
2024	Gabrielle Bates	Judas Goat: Poems	Finalists	
2024	Translated by Michael Freiling, Satsuki Takikawa, Shelley Barker-Gard, and Duane Watari	They Never Asked: Senryu Poetry from the WWII Portland Assembly Center	Finalists	
2024	Jeanine Hall Gailey	Flare, Corona	Finalists	
2024	Rob Schlegel	Childcare	Finalists	
2024	Edited by Derek Sheffield, Elizabeth Bradfield, and Cmarie Fuhrman	Cascadia Field Guide: Art, Ecology, Poetry	Finalists	
2025	Lena Khalaf Tuffaha	Something About Living	Winner	
2025	Susan Rich	Blue Atlas	Finalists	
2025	Thomas Thomas	My Heart Is Not Asleep	Finalists	
2025	Sarah Stockton	The Scarecrow of My Former Self	Finalists	
2025	Katie Prince	Tell This to the Universe	Finalists	
2025	Martha Silano	This One We Call Ours	Finalists	

==== Young Adult Literature ====
Year	Author	Title	Result
2020	Brittney Morris	SLAY	Winner
2020	Maureen Doyle McQuerry	Between Before & After	Finalists
2020	Jeff Henigson	Warhead: The True Story of One Teen Who Almost Saved the World	Finalists
2020	Shaun Hutchinson	Brave Face	Finalists
2021	Jennifer Longo	What I Carry	Winner
2021	Diana Ma	Heiress Apparently	Finalists
2021	Christy Peterson	Into the Deep: Science, Technology, and the Quest to Protect the Ocean	Finalists
2021	J. Anderson Coats	Spindle and Dagger	Finalists
2021	Rachel Lynn Solomon	Today Tonight Tomorrow	Finalists
2021	Deb Caletti	Girl, Unframed	Finalists
2022	Margaret Owen	Little Thieves	Winner
2022	Eireann Corrigan	Remedy	Finalists
2022	Shaun David Hutchinson	A Complicated Love Story Set in Space	Finalists
2022	Nova McBee	Calculated	Finalists
2022	Joy McCullough	We Are the Ashes, We Are the Fire	Finalists
2023	Will Taylor	The Language of Seabirds	Winner
2023	Shaun David Hutchinson	Howl	Finalists
2023	Vanessa L. Torres	The Turning Pointe	Finalists
2024	Margaret Owen	Painted Devils	Winner
2024	T. J. Carroll	The Golden Needle	Finalists
2024	Joy McCullough	Enter the Body	Finalists
2025	K.A. Cobell	Looking for Smoke	Winner
2025	Dan Gemeinhart	Coyote Lost and Found	Finalists
2025	Parisa Akhbari	Just Another Epic Love Poem	Finalists
2025	Hemant Nayak	A Magic Fierce and Bright	Finalists
2025	Leslie Lutz	Sweetest Darkness	Finalists
2025	Natalie Leif	Take All of Us	Finalists

==== Books for Young Readers ====
Year	Author	Title	Result	Ref.
2020	Clare Hodgson Meeker	Growing Up Gorilla: How a Zoo Baby Brought Her Family Together	Winner	
2020	Kelly Jones	Sauerkraut	Finalists	
2020	Sara Nickerson	Last Meeting of the Gorilla Club	Finalists	
2020	Randall Platt	Professor Renoir's Collection of Oddities, Curiosities, and Delights	Finalists	
2020	Trudi Trueit	Explorer Academy: The Falcon's Feather	Finalists	
2020	Dori Hillestad Butler	King & Kayla and the Case of Found Fred	Finalists	
2021	Sarah Kapit	Get a Grip, Vivy Cohen!	Winner	
2021	Joy McCullough	A Field Guide to Getting Lost	Finalists	
2021	Lily LaMotte, illustrated by Ann Xu	Measuring Up	Finalists	
2021	Cat Patrick	Tornado Brain	Finalists	
2021	Heidi Lang and Kati Bartowski	Whispering Pines	Finalists	
2021	Dori Hillestad Butler, illustrated by Kevan Atteberry	Dear Beast	Finalists	
2022	Sundee Frazier	Mighty Inside	Winner	
2022	Jake Maia Arlow	Almost Flying	Finalists	
2022	Donna Barba Higuera	The Last Cuentista	Finalists	
2022	Kelly Jones	Happily For Now	Finalists	
2022	Donna Sandstrom, illustrated by Sarah Burwash	Orca Rescue: The True Story of an Orphaned Orca Named Springer	Finalists	
2023	Tae Keller	Jennifer Chan Is Not Alone	Winner	
2023	Ben Clanton	Narwhalicorn and Jelly	Finalists	
2023	Sonja Thomas	Sir Fig Newton and the Science of Persistence	Finalists	
2024	Jessixa Bagley, illustrated by Aaron Bagley	Duel	Winner	
2024	Jake Maia Arlow	The Year My Life Went Down the Toilet	Finalists	
2024	Donna Barba Higuera	Alebrijes: Cuentista	Finalists	
2024	Joy McCullough	Code Red	Finalists	
2024	Lora Senf	The Nighthouse Keeper	Finalists	
2024	Alder Van Otterloo	The Beautiful Something Else	Finalists	
2025	Scott Kurtz	Table Titans Club	Winner	
2025	Vikram Madan	Beware the Dragon and the Nozzlewock	Finalists	
2025	Iron Tazz with Martin Stanev (illus.)	Hike It: An Introduction to Camping, Hiking, and Backpacking	Finalists	
2025	Lora Senf with Alfredo Cáceres (illus.)	The Loneliest Place	Finalists	
2025	Lily LaMotte with Ann Xu (illus.)	Unhappy Camper	Finalists	
2025	Ben Guterson with Kristina Kiser (illus.)	The World-Famous Nine	Finalists	
