= Jack Nisbet =

Jack Nisbet may refer to:

- Jack Nisbet (writer)
- Jack Nisbet (cricketer)
