= David Laskin =

American writer

- Born: October 25, 1953 (age 72); Great Neck, New York
- Occupations: Historian, reporter
- Writing career
- Subjects: Travel, history, World War I, weather, biography
- Website: www.davidlaskin.com

David Laskin (born October 25, 1953) is an American writer of books about history, travel, weather, gardens and literary biography.

== Biography ==
Born and raised in Great Neck, New York, Laskin graduated from John L. Miller North Senior High and went to Harvard College (BA in history and literature in 1975) and New College, Oxford (MA in English, 1977). He worked in the editorial department of Bantam Books before becoming a free-lance writer. Laskin married law professor Kate O’Neill in 1982; in 1993 they moved from New York to Seattle, Washington, with their three daughters, Emily, Sarah and Alice.

== Works ==
Though Laskin has written on a range of subjects, his recent books have focused on ordinary people swept up in the cataclysms of history. Laskin publishes travel articles and book reviews in The New York Times travel section, The Washington Post, and Seattle Metropolitan.

=== The Family: Three Journeys into the Heart of the 20th Century ===
Published by Viking in 2013, The Family tells the story of the three branches of Laskin's mother's family. At the turn of the last century, the offspring of a pious scribe from the yeshiva town of Volozhin divided into three branches: one branch came to New York and founded two successful businesses (including the successful Maidenform Bra Company, started by Laskin's great aunt Ida Rosenthal), one branch immigrated to what was then Palestine and helped found the cooperative farm of Kfar Vitkin, and all of those who remained behind were murdered in the Holocaust.

=== The Long Way Home ===
The Long Way Home: An American Journey from Ellis Island to the Great War (2010), unfolds the lives of a dozen European immigrants who served with the American Expeditionary Force when the nation went to war in 1917. These men – four Italian-Americans, three Jews, two Poles, an Irishman, a Slovak and a Norwegian – fought bravely in the trenches of France and Belgium; three of them were killed in action; two received the Medal of Honor. The Long Way Home won the 2011 Washington State Book Award for History/General Nonfiction.

=== The Children’s Blizzard ===
The Children’s Blizzard, published by HarperCollins in 2004, tells the story of The Schoolhouse Blizzard, a sudden winter storm that bore down on the Upper Midwest on January 12, 1888, and killed hundreds of settlers, many of them children on their way home from one-room prairie schoolhouses. The book won the 2006 Midwest Booksellers’ Choice Award for Nonfiction, the Pacific Northwest Booksellers Award, the Washington State Book Award, and it was a Quill Award finalist in history.

Twelve Who Served: From The Long Way Home
Epifanio Affatato. Born Scala Coeli, Italy, January 3, 1895; emigrated with his brother 1911; joined his father and worked as a laborer in Brooklyn, New York, and briefly on railroads ind Des Moins, Iowa; entered the army April 1, 1918; served as a private first class with Company C, 107th Infantry, 27th Division.
Joseph Chmielewski. Born Russian Partition of Poland, 1896; emigrated 1912; joined his brother and worked as a coal miner in South Fork, Pennsylvania; entered the army June 17, 1917; served as private with Company A, 16th Machine Gun Battalion, 6th Division.
Andrew Christofferson. Born Haugesund, Norway, April 14, 1890; emigrated with his sister-in-law and her children 1911; worked as a farm laborer in Larimore, North Dakota, and homesteaded in Chinook, Montana; entered the army June 25, 1918; served as private first class with Company M, 321st Infantry, 81st Wildcat Division.
Maximilian Cieminski. Born Polonia, Wisconsin, October 11, 1891, to immigrants from Kaszubia, Prussion Partition of Poland; worked as a miner and night watchman in his brother-in-law's brewery in Bessemer, Michigan; entered the army November 19, 1917; served as private with Company C, 102nd Infantry 26th "Yankee" Division.
Samuel Dreben. Born Poltava, Ukraine, June 1, 1878; emigrated 1890; enlisted U.S. Infantry 1899 and fought in the Philippines, where he was dubbed "the Fighting Jew"; fought as soldier of fortune in Central America; enlisted February 12, 1918; served as sergeant with Company A, 141st Infantry, 36th Division.
Meyer Epstein. Born Uzda, Russian Pale of Settlement, 1892; emigrated on the Lusitania 1913; worked as hauler and plumber, New York City; entered the army April 27, 1918; served as private with Company H, 58th Infantry, 4th "Ivy" Division.
Samuel Goldberg. Born Lodz, Russian Pale of Settlement, March 19, 1900; emigrated with his mother and siblings 1907; lived in Newark, New Jersey, and later worked in an automobile dealership in Atlanta, Georgia; entered the U.S. Cavalry May 6, 1918; served as private with Company M Troop, 12th Cavalry Regiment.
Matej Kocak. Born Gbely, Slovak section of Austria-Hungary, December 30, 1882; emigrated 1907; enlisted U.S. Marine Corps, October 15, 1907, and reenlisted twice; served in World War I as sergeant with 66th (C) Company, 5th Marine Regiment, 2nd Division.
Tommaso Ottaviano. Born Ciorlano, Italy, May 1896; emigrated with his mother and siblings 1913; worked as a machine operator in Lymansville, Rhode Island; entered army April 27, 1918; served as private with Company I, 310th Infantry, 78th Division.
Antonio Pierro. Born Forenza, Italy, February 15, 1896; emigrated with a cousin 1913; worked as a laborer in Swampscott, Massachusetts; entered the army October 4, 1917; served as private with Battery E, 320th Field Artillery, 82nd "All-American" Division.
Peter Thompson. Born County Antrim, Ireland, September 4, 1895; emigrated 1914; worked in the copper mines in Butte, Montana; entered the army in summer 1917; served as private first class (later promoted to sergeant) with Company E, 363nd Infantry, 91st "Wild West" Division.
Michael Valente. Born Sant'Apollinare, Italy, February 5, 1895; emigrated 1913; worked as an orderly in a mental hospital, Ogdensburg, New York; enlisted in New York National Guard, 1916; served as private with Company D, 107th Infantry, 27th Division.

== Bibliography ==
- The Parents Book for New Fathers, Ballantine Books, 1988
- Eastern Islands: Accessible Island of the East Coast, Facts on File, 1990
- A Common Life: Four Generations of American Literary Friendship and Influence, Simon & Schuster, 1994
- The Reading Group Book, Plume/Penguin, 1995
- Braving the Elements: The Stormy History of American Weather, Doubleday, 1996
- Rains All the Time: A Connoisseur’s History of Weather in the Pacific Northwest, Sasquatch Books, 1997
- Partisans: Marriage, Politics and Betrayal Among the New York Intellectuals, Simon & Schuster, 2001
- Artists in Their Gardens, Sasquatch Books, 2001
- The Children’s Blizzard, HarperCollins, 2004
- The Long Way Home: An American Journey from Ellis Island to the Great War, (Harper, 2010)
- The Family: Three Journeys into the Heart of the Twentieth Centurey, (Viking, 2013)
