= Laurie Frankel =

American writer

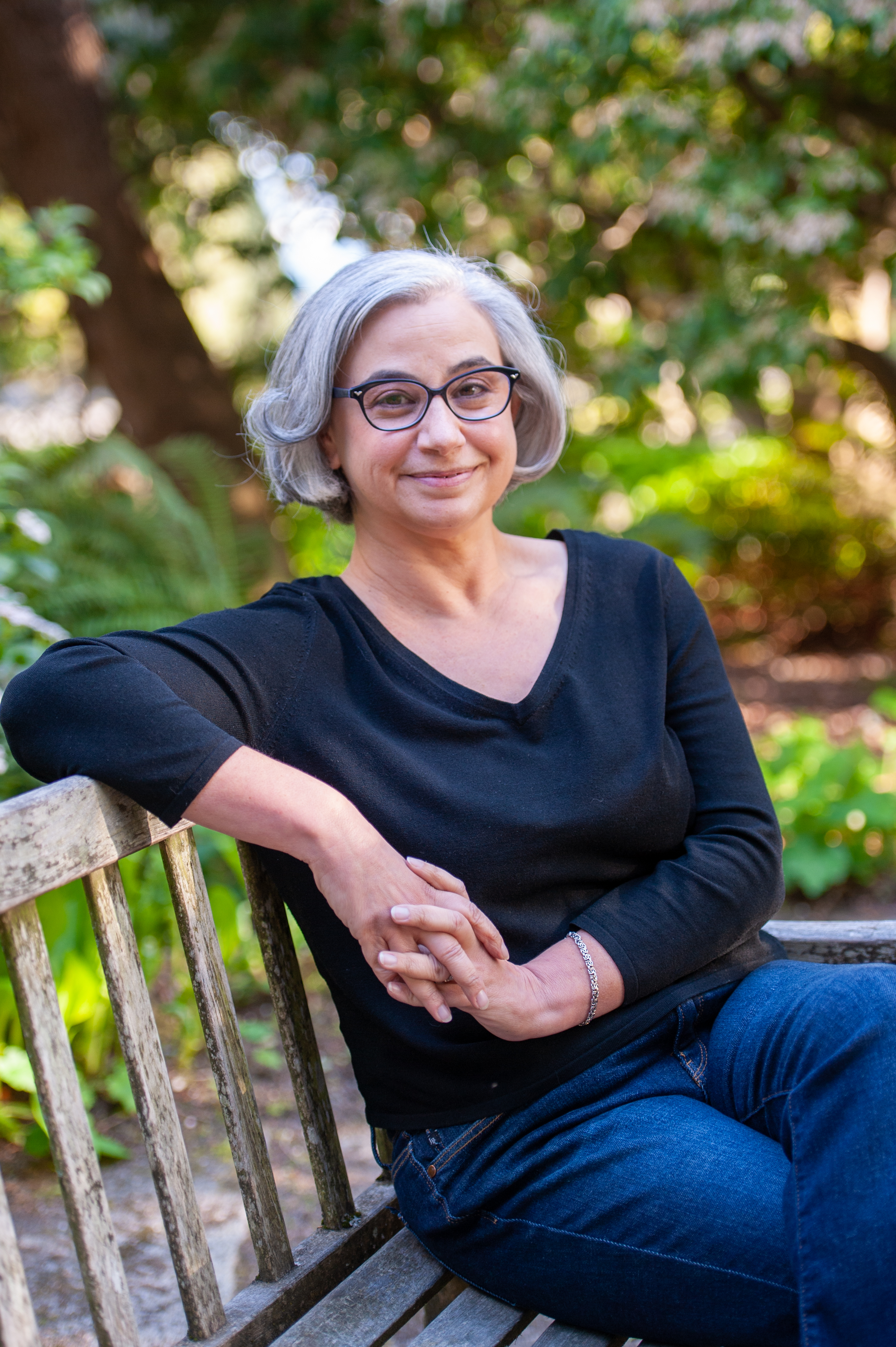
Laurie Frankel

Laurie Frankel is an American novelist, essayist, and public speaker. She has written several novels including This is How it Always Is, which received generally positive reviews, despite stirring controversy of its subject matter of a child's gender transition. Frankel is an advocate for transgender rights.

== Writings ==
Though she had already published two novels to critical acclaim, Frankel attracted significant attention when her essay, "From He To She In First Grade" was published in the New York Times' Modern Love column in 2016. The essay, which chronicled Frankel's daughter's transition from male to female at age six, provoked angry reactions from many readers who thought allowing her young child to choose a different gender than the one she was assigned at birth was "ruining this country". "A lot of people wrote wishing for my death, and that of my kid," she told WBUR in an interview. The essay was followed by the publication of her novel This Is How It Always Is in 2016. The novel, a fictional account of a large family of five boys, the youngest of whom becomes a girl, garnered Frankel rave reviews and bestseller status. Her fifth novel, Family Family, is scheduled for release by Henry Holt and Company on January 23, 2024.

== Advocacy ==
Frankel is an outspoken advocate for transgender rights; she has also written openly about adoption as a choice she and her husband willingly made rather than as a last resort for parents who cannot beget their own children.

== Awards ==
She has won the Washington State Book Award and the Endeavour Award for Science Fiction.

== Novels ==
- The Atlas Of Love (2009)
- Goodbye For Now (2012)
- This Is How It Always Is (2017)
- One, Two, Three (2021)
- Family Family (2024)
- Enormous Wings (2026)
