= Sasha LaPointe =

Native American poet and writer from Washington State, U.S.

- taqwšəblu
- Born: Washington
- Citizenship: Nooksack Indian Tribe and U.S.
- Education: Institute of American Indian Arts (MFA)
- Occupations: poet, writer, educator
- Years active: 21st century
- Employer: Evergreen State College
- Notable work: Red Paint: The Ancestral Autobiography of a Coast Salish Punk (2022)
- Relatives: Vi taqʷšəblu Hilbert (great-grandmother)

Sasha taqʷšəblu (taqwšəblu) LaPointe is an Indigenous author from the Pacific Northwest of the United States. She is a citizen of the Nooksack Indian Tribe. She is most known for her 2022 memoir Red Paint: The Ancestral Autobiography of a Coast Salish Punk, and book of poetry, Rose Quartz.

== Personal life and education ==
Sasha LaPointe is Nooksack, a Coast Salish tribe, and she has Upper Skagit and European-American ancestry. She grew up on the Swinomish Reservation in Washington in the 1980s and 1990s.

Her great-grandmother Vi taqʷšəblu Hilbert was a revered elder of the Upper Skagit Tribe, who has served as an inspiration for her writing.

LaPointe has a double MFA in creative nonfiction and poetry. She graduated from the Institute of American Indian Arts in 2018.

She was a member of the punk rock band Medusa Stare and is an instructor at Evergreen State College in Olympia.

== Career ==
LaPointe's 2022 memoir Red Paint: The Ancestral Autobiography of a Coast Salish Punk^{[1]} was published to significant critical acclaim in 2022. It received the 2023 Pacific Northwest Book Award and the Washington State Book Award for Creative Nonfiction/Memoir. It was listed one of BookPage's Best Nonfiction Books of the Year. The memoir details her experience as a person of Coast Salish heritage, following her childhood and life as a young punk rocker, as well her family legacy. An article for NPR explored her motivation for becoming an author, writing "LaPointe is tired of the ways white people have decided language for native experiences". The book was partially funded by Artist Trust GAP Grant, which she received in 2018.

Her debut book of poetry Rose Quartz was published to critical acclaim in 2023. The Library Journal called it, "beautifully rendered". This poetry collection centers on themes of trauma, healing, and the Indigenous heritage of the Pacific Northwest. A review in Autostraddle reads, "The beginning of the collection drops us into Lapointe’s reality: an Indigenous woman living in the Pacific Northwest, proclaiming and explaining the world in which her relatives are so inherently linked to the mud and clay around her; 'the red paint / is for healing."

Her 2024 book of essays Thunder Song was featured as one of Nylon's March 2024 Must Read New Releases. Electric Lit also listed the book as one of the 42 Queer Books You Need to Read in 2024. Kirkus Reviews described the work as exploring "the importance of sustaining ancestral relations, the difficulty of balancing the imperatives of opposed cultural worlds, the toxic biases of the mainstream media, and the injustices and lethal prejudices of the severely flawed American health care system".

== Bibliography ==
=== Books ===
- LaPointe, Sasha (2022). Red Paint: The Ancestral Autobiography of a Coast Salish Punk. Counterpoint. ISBN 978-1640094147.
- LaPointe, Sasha (2023). Rose Quartz. Milkweed Editions. ISBN 978-1571315434.
- Thunder Song (2024)

=== Poetry ===
- What he should have said (2018)
- Blue (2019)
- Monarch (2022)

Her work has been featured extensively in the AS/Us journal. One of her poems was also featured in the Spring 2022 volume of the Yellow Medicine Review.

=== Essays ===
- The Saturday Rumpus Essay: Fairy Tales, Trauma, Writing into Dissociation (2016)
- ‘Bring Me The Girl’: Why ‘The Revenant’ was Hard for My Friends and Me (2016)
- As An Indigenous Woman, I Always Hate Thanksgiving. This Year I'm Terrified Of It (2020)
