= Gregory Spatz =

American writer

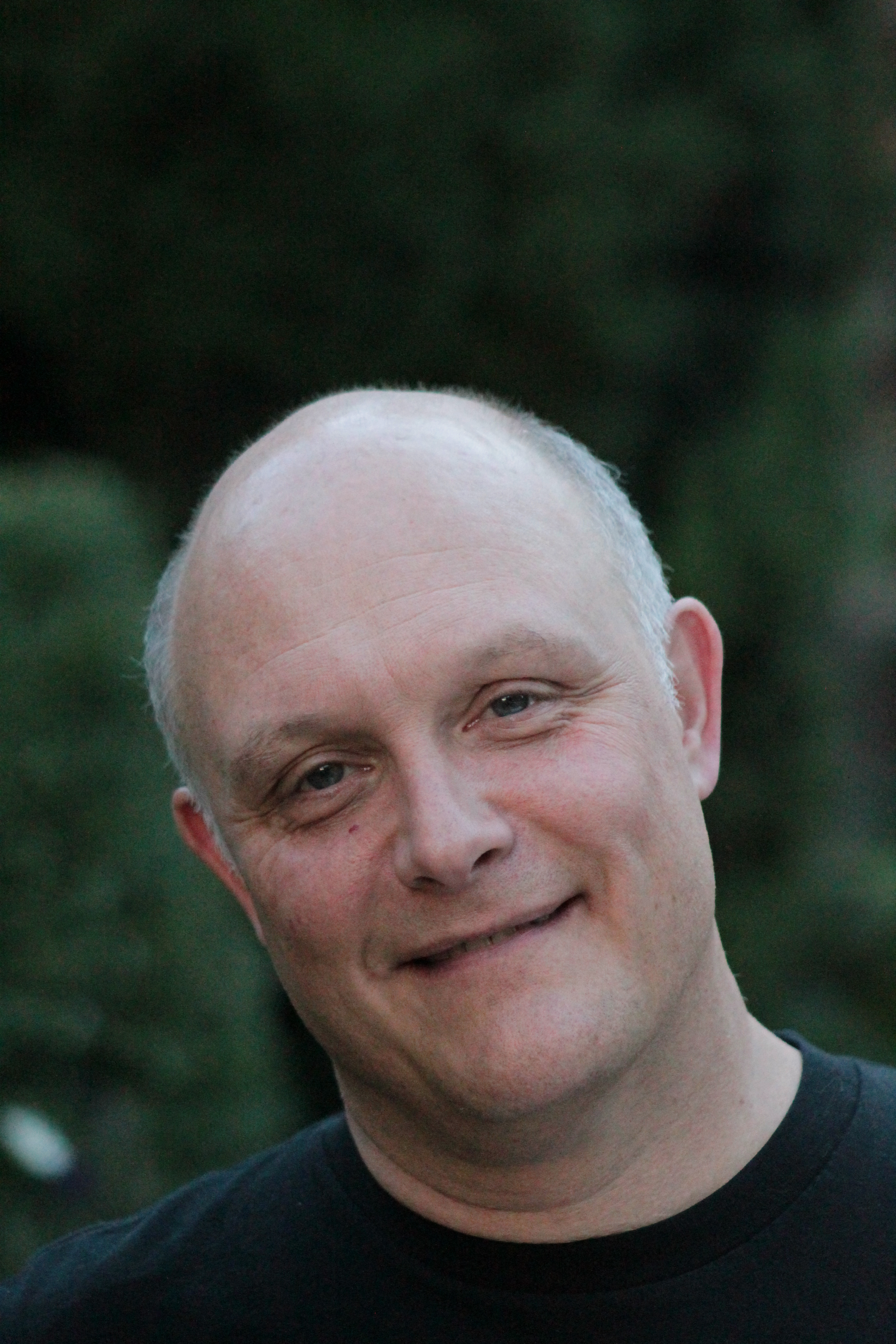
- Born: 1964 (age 61–62)
- Education: Haverford College; University of New Hampshire; University of Iowa, Iowa Writers' Workshop
- Website: gregoryspatz.com

Gregory Spatz (born 1964) is an American author and musician based in the state of Washington. He is most known for writing the novel Inukshuk and for Half as Happy, a collection of short stories. He is a teacher at Eastern Washington University and tours with John Reischman and The Jaybirds, a bluegrass band.

Spatz has published short stories in the New England Review, Glimmer Train, Epoch, The Kenyon Review, The New Yorker and in other literary journals. In 2003, Spatz won the Washington State Book Award for Wonderful Tricks and he was the recipient of the 2012 NEA Literature Fellowship. He has also won numerous grants from the Washington State Artist Trust.

== Early life and education ==
Spatz was born in New York City and spent his youth in New England, mostly in the Berkshires. His grandparents owned a farm close to Connecticut and had a subscription at Tanglewood, the Boston Symphony Orchestra's summer headquarters. They took him there often, and one day Spatz asked for violin lessons. He started playing violin at the age of five.

He completed his BA at Haverford College in 1986 and an MA at the University of New Hampshire in 1990. In 1994, an MFA followed from the University of Iowa, Iowa Writers' Workshop.

== Career ==
During his 20s and 30s, Spatz supported himself financially by playing music and touring. He plays the violin with John Reischman and The Jaybirds and bouzouki with Mighty Squirrel, an eclectic, acoustic quartet. After completing his MA from the University of New Hampshire in 1990, he taught in the Upward Bound program for some time and also edited a few manuscripts. During that time, he also started writing short stories, some of which were later included in Wonderful Tricks.

Spatz is a director of the MFA program at the Inland Northwest Center for Writers at Eastern Washington University. He teaches regularly at the Olympic Valley Community of Writers.

He has published three novels, two short story collections and many short stories. His stories have been published in the New England Review, Glimmer Train Stories, Epoch, The Kenyon Review, Santa Monica Review, and The New Yorker. He also writes about folk, bluegrass and acoustic music. In 2003, he won the Washington State Book Award for Wonderful Tricks. He is a finalist for the 2014 Washington State Book Award in the fiction category for Half as Happy.

=== No One But Us ===
Spatz published his first novel No One But Us in 1995. It is story of a teenager who is abandoned by his father at a young age. It was positively reviewed, with Kirkus Reviews writing that it was "an amiable first novel that manages to breathe new life into the most standard coming-of-age plot," and Publishers Weekly called it a "promising debut novel." The Los Angeles Times called it "an American road novel in its purest form."

=== Wonderful Tricks ===
Wonderful Tricks is the first collection of short stories written by Spatz. It was published in 2002 and contains ten stories that continue the themes of his first novel, No One But Us. Kirkus Reviews called the collection a "delightful downbeat debut collection." It was also the winner of Mid-List's First Series Award for short fiction. The New York Times wrote that the collection Wonderful Tricks shows "tender portraits of people caught in difficult, in-between moments ripe with choice, vignettes that can spark a recollection of the heartbreaking struggles of youth."

=== Fiddler's Dream ===
Fiddler's Dream was published in 2006. The novel tells the story of a Vermont fiddler who dreams of becoming a part of Bill Monroe's band. The book was reviewed positively. The Seattle Times wrote that "the novel is not just a coming-of-age story but a poetic insight into the world of the musician" and Alan Cheuse said that "When a gifted writer finds the language to combine a love of music and a knowledge of music, something just clicks."

=== Inukshuk ===
Inukshuk is a 2012 novel that tells the story of a father and his teenage son who gets lost in his historical obsession with the Victorian-era Arctic expedition of John Franklin. Franklin, the inspiration for the novel, was a distant relative of Spatz. Spatz worked on Inukshuk for about five years.

The novel received considerable media coverage and was reviewed positively. Publishers Weekly called the story "a layered journey that is hauntingly honest and emotionally resonant." The Seattle Times wrote that "in weaving together the story of the historic Franklin and the modern Franklins, Spatz offers an elaborate tale of family and the paths people take to understanding."

=== Half as Happy ===
Half as Happy is the second story collection published by Spatz. The collection contains eight stories. It was published by Engine Books in 2013. All stories in the collection were previously published in literary journals. Three of the eight stories originally appeared in the New England Review.

The Nervous Breakdown called the stories vibrant, richly described and indelible. The Brooklyn Rail said that "Spatz delivers intricate fiction that goes against the grain of conventional expectation" and Publishers Weekly wrote that, "Spatz writes like a dream."

== Awards and honors ==
- Michener Fellowship
- Iowa Arts Fellowship
- Washington State Book Award - 2003
- Fellowship from the National Endowment for the Arts - 2012
- Washington State Book Award finalist - 2014

== Bibliography ==
- No One But Us (1995) Algonquin Books of Chapel Hill ISBN 978-1565120372
- Wonderful Tricks (First Series: Short Fiction) (2002) MidList Press ISBN 978-0922811557
- Fiddler's Dream: A Novel (2006) Southern Methodist University Press ISBN 978-0870745089
- Inukshuk (2012) Bellevue Literary Press ISBN 978-1934137420
- Half as Happy: stories (2013) Engine Books ISBN 978-1938126093
