= Elissa Washuta =

American author

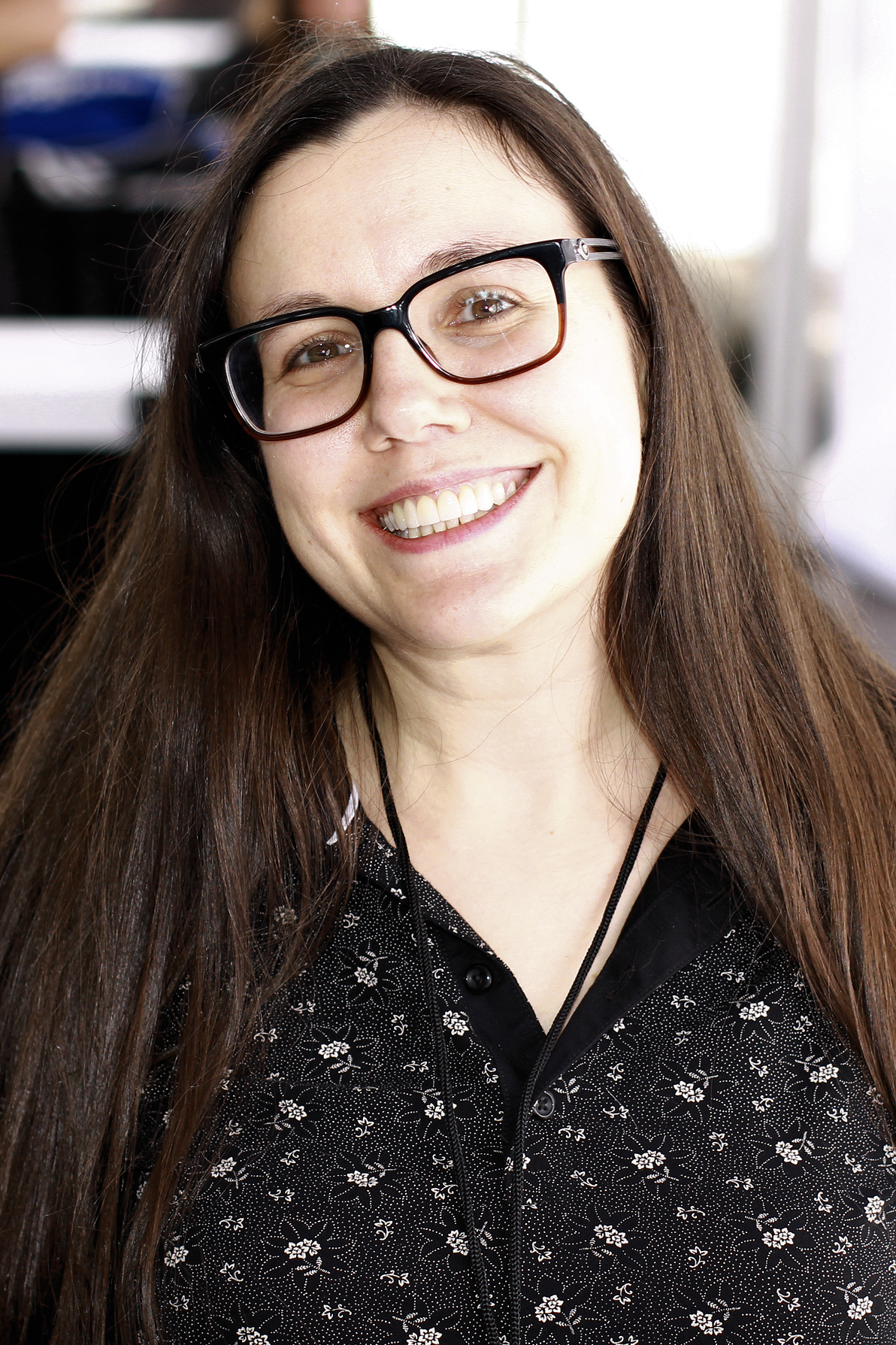
Washuta at the 2019 Texas Book Festival.

Elissa Washuta is a Native American author from the Cowlitz people of Washington State. She has written two memoirs about her young adulthood, Starvation Mode: a Memoir of Food, Consumption and Control and My Body is a Book of Rules, about her personal history with eating disorders and body dysmorphia. She writes about sexual assault, mental health issues as a young adult, and struggling with her identity within the Indigenous community of the Pacific Northwest Coast.

In 2019 Washuta was an assistant professor of English in the Creative Writing program at Ohio State University.

== Early life and education ==
Washuta's mother is an enrolled member of the Cowlitz Indian Tribe and she lived in the Columbia River Gorge region. Her parents met whilst they were at college in Seattle and they moved together to New Jersey. Washuta graduated from high school in Hackettstown, New Jersey in 2003. According to the United States Census Bureau, her family were the only enrolled members of the Cowlitz tribe in her hometown. The Cowlitz tribe had no reservation until 2015, when the federal government awarded it 152 acres near Ridgefield in Clark County, Washington.

Washuta graduated summa cum laude from the University of Maryland in 2007 and earned a master's degree in Creative Writing with a distinction in Fiction Writing from the University of Washington in 2009.

== Career ==
While she worked at the Richard Hugo House, Seattle's center for writers, Washuta mentored emerging writers. She led classes titled "Writing Your Darkest Day" and "Essential Elements of Memoir: Narrative Momentum".

From 2010 to 2014, Washuta was a lecturer at the University of Washington. She was the summer's Writer-In-Residence describing the history of Seattle's Fremont Bridge in 2016. She worked as a writer for the Institute of American Indian Arts before she became Assistant Professor at Ohio State University, teaching courses focused on Creative Writing since her debut at the university in 2017. She was invited to read at Cornell University as part of the Spring 2019 Barbara & David Zalaznick Creative Writing Reading Series.

She is credited, with Joy Harjo, Sherwin Bitsui and Tommy Pico for widening the scope of Native American writings.

From July 2010 to June 2017, she was the Academic Counselor for the Department of American Indian Studies at the University of Washington. She also served as the Interim Youth Programs Coordinator for eight months at the Richard Hugo House from December 2010 to July 2011.

Washuta has written essays for Guernica and Salon.com. She was the co-editor of the anthology Exquisite Vessel: Shapes of Native Nonfiction, from University of Washington Press. She also contributed to This Is The Place: Women Writing About Home, a Seal Press anthology and New York Times Editors Best Pick Choice.

Washuta received the National Endowment for the Arts Literature Creative Writing Fellowship for $25,000 for general career advancement goals. She has received the Artists Trusts Innovator Award which is awarded to artists with exceptional talent and abilities. She has won the 4Culture Art Project Award which is granted to an individual in King County, Washington, to help to share their work. My Body Is a Book of Rules was a finalist for the Washington State Book Award in 2015.

== Publications ==
Essays

- "The wrongheaded obsession with 'vanishing' indigenous peoples" (November 2013, Salon.com)
- "I am not Pocahontas" (September 2014, The Weeklings)
- "This Indian Does Not Owe You" (September 2014, BuzzFeed News)
- Consumption (June 2015, Electric Literature)
- "They Just Dig: On Writing, Coal Mining, and Fear" (March 2016, Literary Hub)
- "Apocalypse Logic" (November 2016, The Offing)
- "White City" (March 2017, The Offing)
- "Shark Girl" (April 2017, CityArts Magazine)
- "Wednesday Addams Is Just Another Settler" (November 2017, Electric Literature)
- "The Sun Disappears" (November 2018, Canadian Art)
