= Frances McCue =

American poet and arts administrator

Frances McCue (born 1962) is an American poet, writer, and teacher. She has published four books of poetry and two books of prose. Her poetry collection The Bled (2010) received the 2011 Washington State Book Award and the 2011 Grub Street National Book prize. Three of her other books, Mary Randlett Portraits (2014), Timber Curtain (2017), and The Car That Brought You Here Still Runs (2014) were all finalists for the Washington State Book Award.

In 1996, McCue co-founded Richard Hugo House, a literary organization in Seattle, where she served as the founding director for the organization’s first decade. During that time, she researched Richard Hugo and the Pacific Northwest towns that inspired his poems.

McCue is a professor at the University of Washington. She is also the founding editor of Pulley Press, an imprint of Clyde Hill Publishing that focuses on poetry.

== Life and career ==
Frances McCue was born in North Tarrytown, New York in 1962. After her parents’ divorce in 1963, she spent her early years with her grandparents and mother in Cincinnati and on Cape Cod. In 1975, her mother remarried, and the family moved to Western Pennsylvania. McCue attended boarding schools in New England and received her Bachelor of Arts at the University of New Hampshire. She graduated from the University of Washington with an MFA in creative writing before receiving a Klingenstein Fellowship from Columbia University, where she studied linguistics, English education, architecture, and administrative leadership. She received an EdM in 1996 and an EdD in 2001. She is a teaching professor at the University of Washington.

McCue co-founded Richard Hugo House in 1996 with Linda Breneman and Andrea Lewis. She served as Hugo House's Founding Director for ten years. Her work for Richard Hugo House won her an Evergreen State Service Award in 2002 and a 2003 History Makers Award from the Museum of History and Industry. In 2015, McCue began work on Where the House Was a documentary film weaving together the history of Hugo House, the life and work of poet Richard Hugo, and ongoing gentrification in Seattle. The film, directed by Ryan K. Adams, was released in 2018. Production of the film also inspired McCue's 2017 poetry collection Timber Curtain.

In 2009, McCue's husband, Seattle activist Gary Greaves, died unexpectedly. His death inspired her 2010 book The Bled.

In 2020, she released I Almost Read the Books Whole, a collection of fake book jacket blurbs. In the same year, she founded a poetry imprint of Clyde Hill Publishings called Pulley Press.

== Awards ==
Her first poetry collection, The Stenographer's Breakfast, won the Barnard New Women's Poetry Prize. Her second collection, The Bled, received the 2011 Washington State Book Award for poetry, and the 2011 Grub Street National Book prize. In 2011 and 2015 she was a finalist for the award in the History/General Nonfiction category, first for her book The Car That Brought You Here Still Runs: Revisiting the Northwest Towns of Richard Hugo and then for Mary Randlett Portraits. In 2018, she was a finalist for the Washington State Book Award. She has been nominated for a Pushcart Prize, and she has been a runner-up for the Milliman Prize and a Stranger Genius Award, and has won the Joan Grayston Poetry Prize, Richard Blessing Scholarship, the Bumbershoot Written Works Competition, a GAMMA award, and the Grub Street National Book prize.

== Works ==
Frances McCue’s work has appeared in Ms. Magazine, New York Times Book Review, Pittsburgh Post-Gazette, The Stranger, The Seattle Times, Nest Magazine, Teachers College Record, Seattle Social Justice, Journal of National Collegiate Honors Council, The Georgia Review, Arcade, and Tin House Magazine. Her work has been included in multiple anthologies, including Seattle City of Literature (Sasquatch Books, 2015), Wordswest Anthology (Wordswest Press, 2015), Make it True: Poems from Cascadia (Leaf Press, Vancouver BC, 2015), Looking Together (University of Washington Press, 2009), Worlds in Our Words: Contemporary American Women Writers (Prentice Hall, 1997), and For a Living: The Poetry of Work (University of Illinois Press, 1995).

=== Books ===
- The Stenographer's Breakfast. Boston, MA: Beacon Press. 1992. ISBN 978-0-8070-6817-5.
- The Car That Brought You Here Still Runs. Seattle, Washington: University of Washington Press. 2010. ISBN 9780295989648.
- The Bled. North Amherst, MA: Factory Hollow Press. 2010. ISBN 978-0984069873.
- Mary Randlett Portraits. Seattle, WA: University of Washington Press. 2014. ISBN 9780295993973.
- Timber Curtain. Seattle, WA: Chin Music Press. 2017. ISBN 978-1634059121.
- I Almost Read The Books Whole. Factory Hollow Press. 2020.

=== Essays ===
- "Self-Hatred Can Be Funny", Poetry Foundation
- "Dreaming Richard Hugo," The Georgia Review, Summer 2008.

=== Poetry Publications ===
- "Mary of the Woods, of the City: A Prayer"; "Mother and Clone"; "New Anthropology", Caffeine Destiny
- "WORK, FATE AND SCENIC LANDSCAPE", Square Lake 6, 2004
- "Us, Back Round", Tarpaulin Sky, Spring 2007
- "The Patient Saint"; "The Tourist and the City" Cutbank Magazine, 2008
- "Turning to Ghosts in the Cemetery by the Sea", Upstreet, 2011
- "Aviary Kitchen", Silk Road, 2012
- "Good Intentions"; "The Poet's Wife" Crab Creek Review, 2014
- "Not Looking Up", Jubilant, 2017

=== Prose Publications ===
- "Self-Hatred Can Be Funny", Poetry Foundation, 2006
- "On Richard Hugo", The Georgia Review, 2008
- "Not Diamonds", Cutbank, 2009
- "Song of the Disrupted," in "Forum on Honors and the Future of the Humanities, Journal of National Collegiate Honors Council; Vol. 16, No 1, 2015
