= David R. Montgomery =

Professor of earth and space sciences

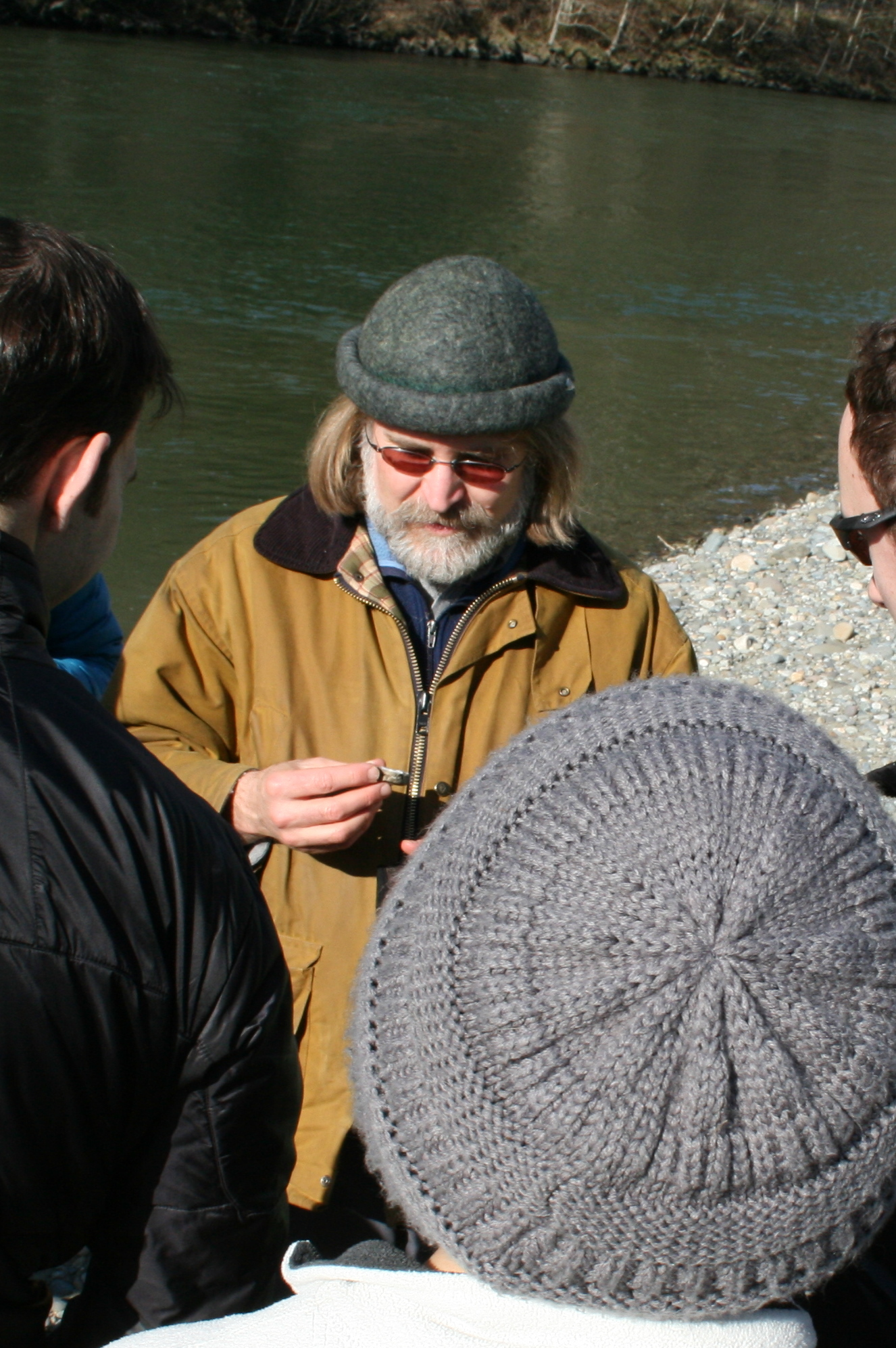
- David R. Montgomery
- Education: B.S., Stanford; Ph.D., UC Berkeley
- Occupation: University of Washington professor
- Writing career
- Subject: Geology
- Notable awards: MacArthur Fellowship, 2008; Washington State Book Award, 2004, 2008, & 2013

David R. Montgomery is a professor of earth and space sciences at the University of Washington in Seattle, where he is a member of the Quaternary Research Center.

Montgomery received his B.S. in geology from Stanford University in 1984, and his Ph.D. in geomorphology from University of California, Berkeley in 1991. His research addresses the evolution of topography and the influence of geomorphological processes on ecosystems and human societies. His published work includes studies of the role of topsoil in human civilization, the evolution and near-extirpation of salmon, geomorphological processes in mountain drainage basins, the evolution of mountain ranges, and the use of digital topography. He has conducted field research in eastern Tibet, South America, the Philippines, Alaska, and the American Pacific Northwest.

Montgomery's first popular-audience book, King of Fish: The Thousand-Year Run of Salmon explored the history of salmon fisheries in Europe, New England, California, and the Pacific Northwest. It won the 2004 Washington State Book Award in General Nonfiction.

In 2008 Montgomery received a MacArthur Fellowship. His book, Dirt: The Erosion of Civilizations won the 2008 Washington State Book Award in General Nonfiction.

Montgomery's 2012 book, The Rocks Don't Lie: A Geologist Investigates Noah's Flood explores the relationship between catastrophic floods in the distant past, flood legends, "Noachian flood geology", and geologic discovery over the past several hundred years. It won the 2013 Washington State Book Award in General Nonfiction.

After the catastrophic Oso mudslide in Washington State in March, 2014, Montgomery appeared on various news segments to discuss the science behind landslides. He appears in DamNation the 2014 documentary film about dam removal in the United States.

In 2015, Montgomery appeared, as a geologist, in the PBS documentary film, Making North America.

In 2016, Montgomery published The Hidden Half of Nature: The Microbial Roots of Life and Health, a collaboration with Anne Biklé. The book addresses the relationship between microbial life, plants, and people.

Growing A Revolution: Bringing Our Soil Back to Life, was released with W.W. Norton and Company in May 2017.

In 2022 he and Anne Biklé released What Your Food Ate. His most recent book Regen: A New Future for Farming, Food, and Health (WW Norton, 2026) is a blueprint for restoring soil health, human health, and how farmers can thrive regenerating the soil.

He married Anne B. Biklé on September 7, 2000. She is a biologist and landscape architect who has worked in "field biology, watershed restoration, environmental planning, and public health."
