= Paul Lindholdt =

American author, ecocritic, and professor

- Born: Paul Jeffrey Lindholdt; Seattle, Washington, U.S.
- Education: Western Washington University (BA, MA); Pennsylvania State University (PhD)
- Occupations: Author, ecocritic, professor
- Employer: Eastern Washington University
- Notable work: In Earshot of Water: Notes from the Columbia Plateau
- Spouse: Karen Lindholdt
- Awards: Washington State Book Award (2012)

Paul Lindholdt is an American author, ecocritic, and professor of English at Eastern Washington University. His memoir In Earshot of Water: Notes from the Columbia Plateau (2011) won the 2012 Washington State Book Award for Biography/Memoir.

== Early life and education ==
Lindholdt is originally from Seattle. He earned a Bachelor of Arts in English cum laude in 1978 and a Master of Arts in English in 1980 from Western Washington University, and a PhD in English from Pennsylvania State University in 1985. In a 2012 interview he said he studied with Annie Dillard as an undergraduate.

== Career ==
Lindholdt was a lecturer at Idaho State University from 1984 to 1987 and at Western Washington University from 1987 to 1990, then a visiting assistant professor at the University of Idaho from 1990 to 1994. He joined the faculty of Eastern Washington University in 1994.

His chief research interest is environmental literature. He has been a contributing historian for HistoryLink, an online encyclopedia of Washington State history, since 2012, and a narrative co-editor of The Trumpeter Journal of Ecosophy since 2019.

== Awards ==
- Washington State Book Award for Biography/Memoir (2012), for In Earshot of Water.
- First and second place, Energy and Environmental Reporting, Society of Professional Journalists, Inland Northwest chapter (2000).
- Leonard Steinberg Memorial Prize, Academy of American Poets (1984).

== Works ==
=== Books ===
- Interrogating Travel: Guidance from a Reluctant Tourist. Louisiana State University Press, 2023.
- Making Landfall: Poems. Encircle Publications, 2018.
- The Spokane River. Edited by Lindholdt. University of Washington Press, 2018.
- Explorations in Ecocriticism: Advocacy, Bioregionalism, and Visual Design. Lexington Books, 2015.
- In Earshot of Water: Notes from the Columbia Plateau. University of Iowa Press, 2011.
- The Canoe and the Saddle: A Critical Edition, by Theodore Winthrop (1862). Edited with an introduction by Lindholdt. University of Nebraska Press, 2006.
- Holding Common Ground: The Individual and Public Lands in the American West. Edited with Derrick Knowles. Eastern Washington University Press, 2005.
- History and Folklore of the Cowichan Indians (1901), translated by Martha Douglas Harris. Edited with an introduction by Lindholdt. Marquette Books, 2004.
- Cascadia Wild: Protecting an International Ecosystem. Edited with Mitch Friedman. Greater Ecosystem Alliance, 1993.
- John Josselyn, Colonial Traveler: A Critical Edition of Two Voyages to New-England. University Press of New England, 1988.

=== Selected articles and essays ===
- "Theodore Winthrop in the Washington Territory". Columbia: The Magazine of Northwest History 21, no. 1 (Spring 2007): 5–12.
- "The Fine Art of Bureaucracy". High Country News, January 19, 2009.
- "From Sublimity to Ecopornography: Assessing the Bureau of Reclamation Art Collection". Journal of Ecocriticism 1, no. 1 (2009): 1–25.
- "Antidotes to Humanism". The Trumpeter Journal of Ecosophy 28, no. 1 (2012).
- "Lokout (1834–1913)". HistoryLink, October 27, 2013.
- "Portrait of Yakama Indian Lokout Adds to History of Brother Qualchan". The Spokesman-Review, December 1, 2013.
- "Making Landfall". Terrain.org, August 5, 2019.
- "A Braided Stream: On Keats Conley's Guidance from the God of Seahorses". Poetry Northwest, December 30, 2022.
- "‘Westward I Go Free’: Annie Dillard’s Pilgrim at Tinker Creek". Ecocene 6, no. 1 (June 2025).

== Personal life ==
Lindholdt is married to Karen Lindholdt. He divides his time between Spokane, Washington, and Sandpoint, Idaho.
