= Martha Brockenbrough =

American novelist

- Born: Martha Elizabeth Brockenbrough; Seattle, Washington, U.S.
- Education: Stanford University
- Writing career
- Notable awards: Kirkus Prize Finalist; 2015; YALSA Nominee; 2015; Parents' Choice Award; 2015; Pacific Northwest Booksellers Association Award; 2016; Washington State Book Award; 2016
- Website: marthabrockenbrough.com

Martha Brockenbrough is an American author of fiction and nonfiction for children and adults. Her first book, It Could Happen To You: Diary Of A Pregnancy and Beyond, was published by Andrews McMeel Publishing in 2002. She is the founder of The Society for the Promotion of Good Grammar (SPOGG) and of National Grammar Day (observed in the United States since 2008).

== Life ==
Brockenbrough was born in Seattle, Washington, and graduated in 1992 from Stanford University, where she studied Classics and English. She was editor-in-chief of the student newspaper, the Stanford Daily.

== Career ==
Brockenbrough was editor of MSN.com and was an educational humor columnist for Encarta.com before its demise in 2009. She founded National Grammar Day in 2008.

== Writing awards ==
Brockenbrough's young adult novel The Game of Love and Death, published 2015, was a finalist for the 2015 Kirkus Prize. The book was selected as one of the Top 10 Romances for Youth by the American Library Association's publication, Booklist. It is also a nominee for YALSA's Best Books For Young Adults in 2016. It was listed as one of Publishers Weekly's Best Books of 2015, and won the 2016 Washington State Book Awards in the category Books For Young Adults.

In spring 2016, The Discovery Channel published Brockenbrough's Shark Week: Everything You Need to Know. Publishers Weekly recommended the book to young readers.

Prior to The Game of Love and Death, Brockenbrough wrote Devine Intervention, a Kirkus Reviews Top 100 Books for Teens selection in 2012, and was selected by the Kansas State Reading Circle. It also won a Pacific Northwest Booksellers Association book award for 2016.

In 2022, Brockenbrough's picture book I Am an American: The Wong Kim Ark Story won the Carter G. Woodson Book Award (Elementary Level).

== Bibliography ==
=== Fiction ===
- Brockenbrough, Martha (June 1, 2012). Devine Intervention. Arthur A. Levine Books. ISBN 978-0545382137.
- Brockenbrough, Martha (June 25, 2013). The Dinosaur Tooth Fairy. Arthur A. Levine. ISBN 978-0545244664.
- Brockenbrough, Martha (April 28, 2015). The Game of Love and Death. Arthur A. Levine Books. ISBN 978-0545668347.

=== Non-fiction ===
- Brockenbrough, Martha (September 2, 2002). It Could Happen To You: Diary Of A Pregnancy and Beyond. Andrews McMeel Publishing. ISBN 978-0740726859.
- Brockenbrough, Martha (October 14, 2008). Things That Make Us [Sic]. St. Martin's Press. p. 272. ISBN 978-0312378080.
- Brockenbrough, Martha (August 13, 2013). Finding Bigfoot. Feiwel & Friends. p. 160. ISBN 978-1250040909.
- Brockenbrough, Martha; Discovery (May 17, 2016). Shark Week:Everything You Need to Know. Feiwel & Friends. p. 160. ISBN 978-1250097774.
- Brockenbrough, Martha (September 5, 2017). Alexander Hamilton - Revolutionary. Feiwel & Friends. ISBN 978-1250123190.
- Brockenbrough, Martha (November 13, 2018) Unpresidented: A Biography of Donald Trump. Feiwel & Friends. ISBN 9781250308030.
- Brockenbrough, Martha (November 23, 2021) I Am an American: The Wong Kim Ark Story. Little, Brown Books for Young Readers. ISBN 9780316426923.
