= Carol Cassella =

American novelist

Carol W. Cassella
- Born: Carol Wiley; Dallas, Texas, United States
- Education: Bachelor of Arts, Degree in Medicine
- Alma mater: Duke University, Baylor College of Medicine
- Occupations: Novelist, anesthesiologist
- Writing career
- Genres: Fiction, medical drama
- Website: carolcassella.com

Carol Cassella is an American novelist and practicing anesthesiologist. Born in Dallas, Texas, she lives on Bainbridge Island, Washington with her husband and two sets of twins.

== Early life and education ==
Carol Cassella was born Carol Elise Wiley in Dallas, Texas. She is the youngest of three daughters to Katherine and Ray Wiley, and graduated from Highland Park High School in Dallas, Texas in 1975.

Cassella has a degree in English literature from Duke University, where she was a member of Pi Beta Phi sorority. She attended medical school at Baylor College of Medicine in Houston, Texas. She received her medical degree in 1986 and completed her internship at Baylor-St. Lukes Affiliated Hospitals in Houston, Texas before moving to Seattle where she completed her residency in internal medicine at Virginia Mason Medical Center. In 1992 she returned to Virginia Mason for training in anesthesiology. She is board certified in both internal medicine and anesthesiology.

=== Personal life ===
She married Stephen Rowan Cassella in 1991 and now lives on Bainbridge Island, Washington. They are the parents of fraternal twins born in 1995, and identical twins born in 1996.

== Career ==
Cassella worked for Prentice Hall Publishing Company in New York City before deciding to attend medical school.

She is a practicing anesthesiologist in the Seattle area and also a published novelist. She was the founder of Mind to Mind, the literary section in Anesthesiology, the Journal of the American Society of Anesthesiology, and served as associate editor of the section from 2009 to 2016. She has been a Wall Street Journal Expert Panelist on Healthcare. She is also a founding member of Seattle7Writers, a non-profit supporting literacy and reading in the Pacific Northwest. Prior to writing fiction, she wrote medically centered articles for The Bill & Melinda Gates Foundation profiling their grant recipients working in low resource countries around the world. She published her first novel Oxygen in 2008.

=== Medical career ===
After completing her internal medicine residency at Virginia Mason Medical Center, Cassella practiced primary care at Pacific Medical Center, SeaMar Community Clinic and Pike Market Community Clinic, with a special interest in cross-cultural medicine. In 1992 she began her residency in anesthesiology at Virginia Mason Medical Center and now works as a staff anesthesiologist in the Seattle area. She serves on the health care advisory committee for BOSIA, the Bainbridge Ometepe Sister Islands Association. BOSIA is a non-profit, non-partisan organization focused on people-to-people exchange between residents of Bainbridge Island in Washington State and Ometepe Island in Lake Nicaragua. She enjoys working as a volunteer for charitable medical trips working in low resource countries, including rural Costa Rica, Thailand, Indonesia, Nicaragua, Bhutan and Cuba.

== Literary career ==
Though she studied literature and wrote some fiction throughout her life, Cassella did not begin a serious writing career until she was in her forties. In 2001 she enrolled in creative writing classes and began writing her first novel, Oxygen, which was published in 2008 by Simon & Schuster. The novel was a national bestseller, nominated for the Washington State Book Award, and an Indie Next Pick in 2008. Her second novel, Healer, was also an Indie Next Pick in 2011. Her third novel, Gemini, was an Indie Next selection for March 2014, as well as a Library Reads selection, and won the Pacific Northwest Booksellers Association's BuzzBooks contest. Her books have been highlighted as top choices by Library Journal, Booklist, Harpers Bazaar, People Magazine, Poets & Writers, Womans Day, and USA Today. All of her novels draw from her personal experience as a physician, her role as a mother, and her interest in medical ethics and the complexities of contemporary healthcare. Prior to focusing on fiction, she wrote informational articles for The Bill & Melinda Gates Foundation from 1999 to 2001.

Cassella is a founding member of Seattle 7 Writers, an organization founded in Seattle with the mission to support literacy organizations in the community and to create connections between writers, readers, booksellers, and librarians.

== Publications ==
- Oxygen (Simon & Schuster, 2008): An anesthesiologist at the height of her career faces a malpractice suit after a disastrous operation that ends a child's life. At the same time, she has to cope with her aging father and ultimately confront questions of love and betrayal, family bonds, and the price of her own choices.
- Healer (Simon & Schuster, 2010): When Claire Boehning starts working at a public health clinic, she meets Miguela, a bright Nicaraguan immigrant and orphan of the contra war who has come to the United States on a quest to find her extended family. As their friendship develops, a new mystery unfolds that threatens to destroy Claire's family and forces her to question what it truly means to heal.
- Gemini (Simon & Schuster, 2014): After ICU doctor, Charlotte Reese is put in charge of an unidentified hit-and-run victim whose operation leaves her in a coma, her usual professional distance evaporates as she fights to find out what went wrong and finds herself making increasingly complicated decisions that will tie her forever to the patient's fate.
