= Bruce Holbert =

American writer (born 1959)

- Born: October 4, 1959 (age 66)
- Education: Eastern Washington University; Iowa Writers' Workshop (MFA)
- Occupation: Writer
- Writing career
- Notable awards: Washington State Book Award (2015)

Bruce Holbert (born October 4, 1959) is an American writer. He is the author of the novels Lonesome Animals (Counterpoint Press), and the Hour of Lead (Counterpoint Press) which won the 2015 Washington State Book Award for Fiction and Whiskey (Farrar Straus & Giroux)

== Early life/education ==
Holbert graduated from Lake Roosevelt High School in Coulee Dam in the spring of 1978, then attended Eastern Washington University where he graduated with a degree in English/Education in 1983. He graduated with an MFA from the Iowa Writers' Workshop in 1990.

In 1982, Holbert inadvertently shot and killed one of his friends in a gun accident. Charges against Holbert were eventually dropped. Holbert has stated that he remains "numbed by guilt."

He worked at Mount Spokane High School for 30 years, retiring in 2018.
