= Kelli Russell Agodon =

American poet, writer, and editor

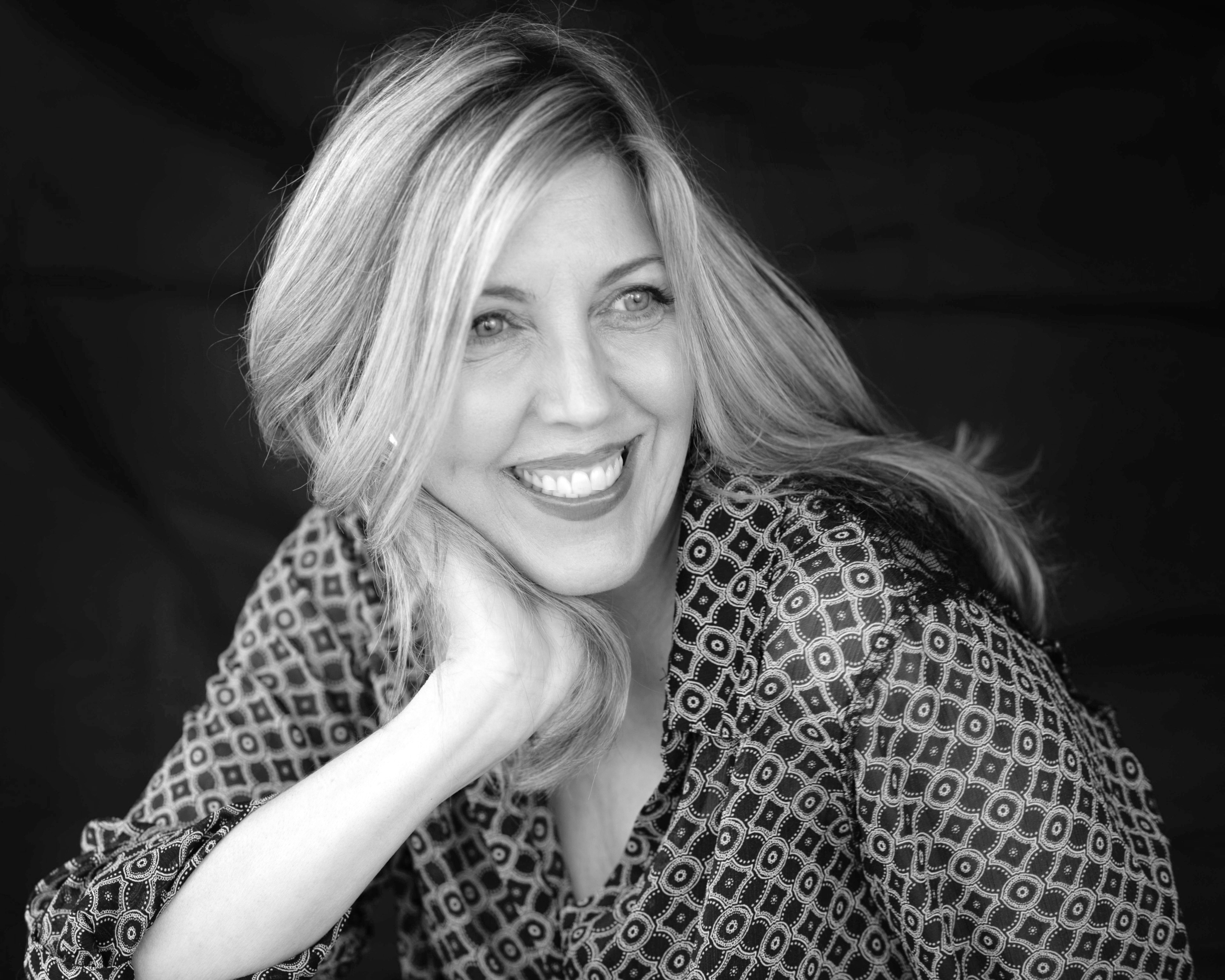
- Kelli Russell Agodon
- Born: Seattle, Washington, U.S.
- Education: University of Washington; Pacific Lutheran University (MFA)
- Occupations: Poet, writer, editor
- Writing career
- Language: English
- Website: www.agodon.com

Kelli Russell Agodon (born in Seattle) is an American poet, writer, and editor. She is the cofounder of Two Sylvias Press and she serves on the poetry faculty at the Rainier Writing Workshop, a low-residency MFA program at Pacific Lutheran University. She co-hosts the poetry series "Poems You Need" with Melissa Studdard. The two are also known for their collaborative poetry.

== Life ==
She was raised in Seattle, and graduated from the University of Washington and Pacific Lutheran University Rainier Writing Workshop with an MFA in creative writing. She lives in Washington state. Her works have appeared in the Atlantic Monthly, American Poetry Review, Prairie Schooner, North American Review, Image, 5 a.m, Meridian, Calyx., poets.org, and The Los Angeles Review.

She lives in the Northwest. She was the editor-in-chief of the Crab Creek Review from 2009 until 2014. She is the co-founder of Two Sylvias Press. She was the co-director of the Poets on the Coast: A Weekend Writing Retreat for Women until 2021, an organization she founded with poet Susan Rich in 2010.

== Recognition ==
Agodon's book of poems, Dialogues with Rising Tides (Copper Canyon Press, 2021), was a Finalist for the Washington State Book Awards and shortlisted for the Eric Hoffer Book Award Grand Prize in Poetry.

Her book, Hourglass Museum (White Pine Press, 2014), was a Finalist for the Washington State Book Awards and shortlisted for the Julie Suk Prize in Poetry.

Her book, Letters from the Emily Dickinson Room (White Pine Press, 2010), won the White Pine Press Poetry Prize judged by Pulitzer Prize winner Carl Dennis. It then won the Foreword Indie Book of the Year Prize in Poetry, was a Finalist for the Washington State Book Award, and voted as one of the Top 20 Books on GoodReads for Poetry.

=== Awards ===
- 2018 Poetry Society of America Lyric Poetry Prize
- 2015 Centrum Residency Recipient
- 2009 Artist Trust GAP Grant Recipient
- 2005 James Hearst Poetry Prize 3rd place
- 2003 Artist Trust GAP Grant Recipient

== Works ==
- "Hunger," Academy of American Poets, Poem-a-Day
- "Braided Between the Broken," New England Review
- "How Killer Blue Irises Spread," The Atlantic
- "Letting Gatsby Out at 11 p.m.," Body Literature
- "Sailing Lepidoptera," "The Half-Moon Couple," Adirondack Review
- "Dord"; "Unintentionally Typing the Word Life Instead of Lips"; "?", Womb Poetry
- "Sometimes I still dream about their pink bodies", Poetry Southeast

=== Books ===
- Geography. Floating Bridge Press. 2003. ISBN 978-1-930446-06-9.
- Small Knots. Cherry Grove Collections. 2004. ISBN 978-1-932339-27-7.
- An Alphabet Between Us. Pacific Lutheran University. 2007.
- Letters From the Emily Dickinson Room, White Pine Press, 2010, ISBN 978-1-935210-15-3
- Hourglass Museum. White Pine Press. 2014. ISBN 978-1935210511.
- Dialogues with Rising Tides. Copper Canyon Press. 2021. ISBN 978-1556596155.

=== Anthologies ===
- Sam Hamill; Sally Anderson, eds. (2003). "Of a Forgetful Sea". Poets against the War. Thunder's Mouth Press. ISBN 978-1-56025-539-0.
- Garrison Keillor, ed. (2005). Good poems for hard times. Viking. ISBN 978-0-670-03436-9.
- Michael A. Lacombe; Tom Hartman, eds. (2008). In Whatever Houses We May Visit: An Anthology of Poems That Have Inspired Physicians. ACP Press. ISBN 978-1-934465-06-6.
