= Kristi Coulter =

American author

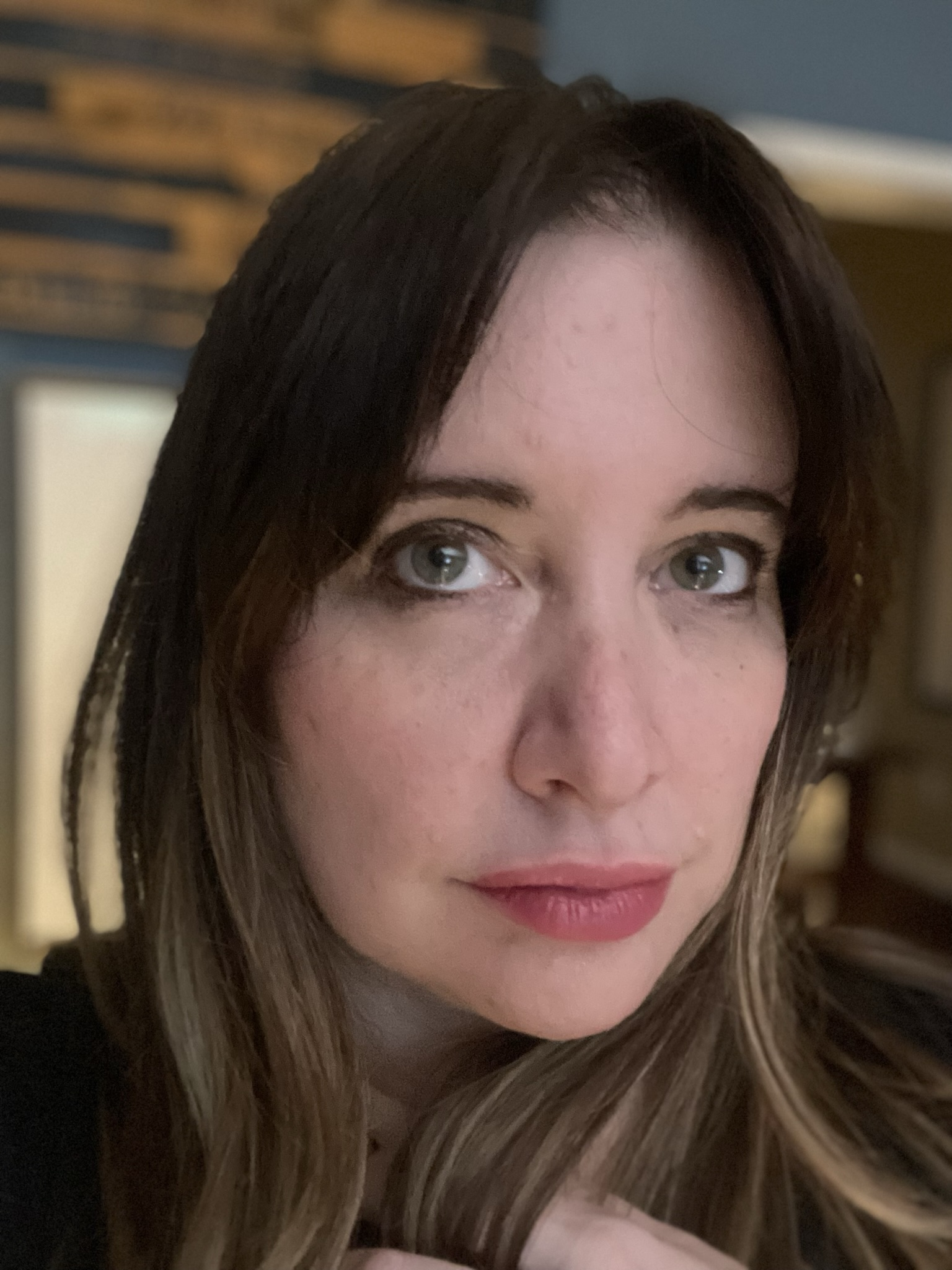
- Coulter in 2023
- Born: April 22, 1970 (age 55)
- Occupation: Author
- Website: www.kristicoulter.com

Kristi Coulter is an American author who has published two memoirs. Nothing Good Can Come from This (2018) describes her problem drinking and sobriety. Exit Interview (2023) describes struggles during her career as an executive at Amazon.

== Early life ==
Coulter grew up in South Florida and attended the New College of Florida.

She graduated from the MFA creative-writing course of the University of Michigan.

She was a content director at All Music Guide before executive roles in retail, publishing, and grocery at Amazon.

== Published works ==
Coulter has published two books.

- Coulter, Kristi (2018). Nothing Good Can Come From This: Essays. MCD/Farrar, Straus and Giroux. ISBN 9780374717087.
- Coulter, Kristi (2023). Exit Interview: The Life and Death of My Ambitious Career. MCD/Farrar, Straus and Giroux. ISBN 9780374600914.

Her first book is a memoir of her problem drinking and her subsequent sobriety; it was a finalist for the 2019 Washington State Book Award. Her second book describes her 12-year career as an executive at Amazon, linking her experience to the struggles of women in the workforce.
