= Kristen Millares Young =

American journalist

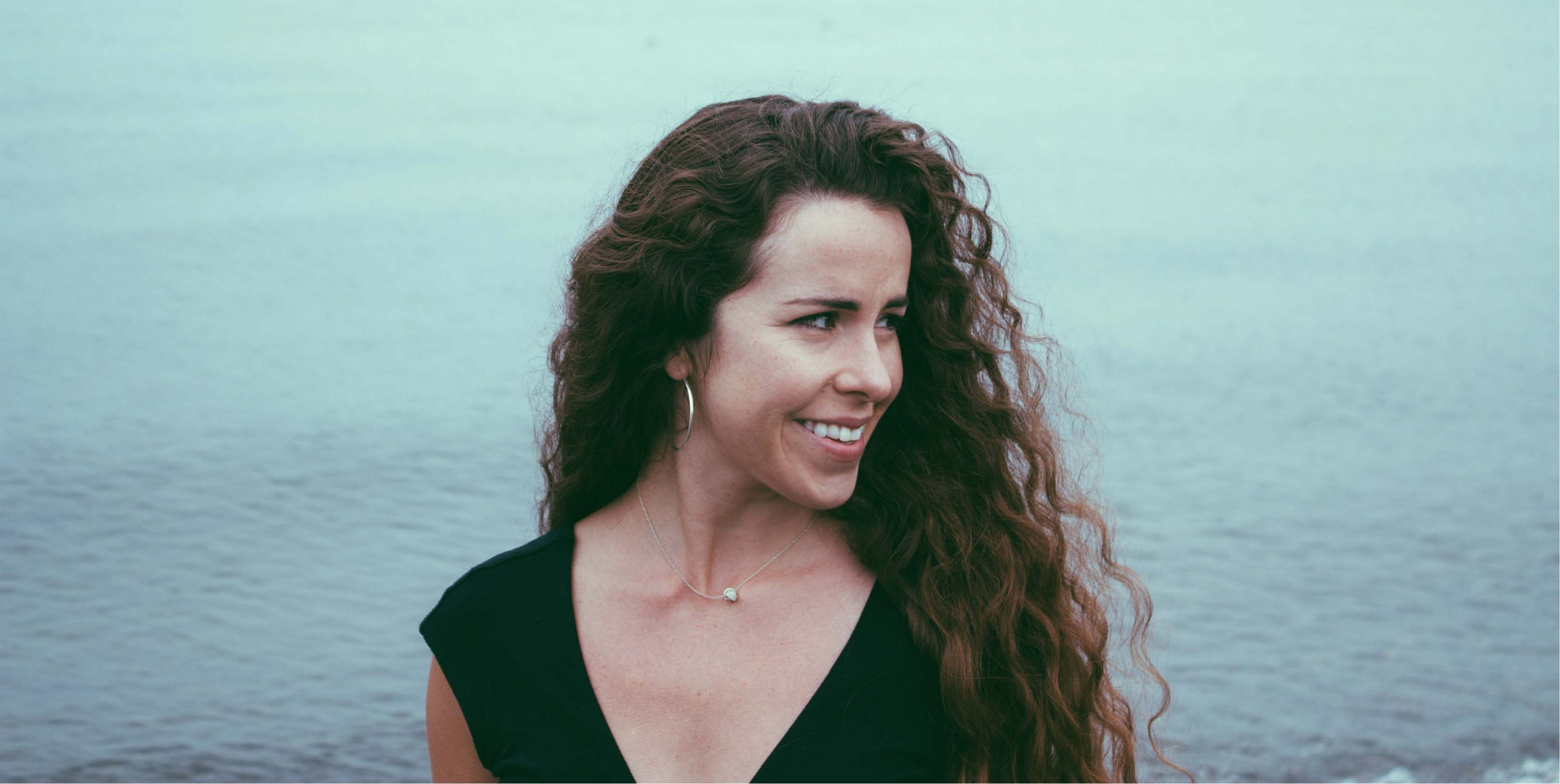
- Education: Harvard University (AB); University of Washington (MFA)
- Occupations: Journalist, author
- Website: kristenmyoung.com

Kristen Millares Young is a Cuban-American investigative journalist, essayist, and novelist.

== Early life and education ==
Young grew up in Florida, attended high school in California, and graduated magna cum laude from Harvard University with an A.B. in History and Literature of Latin America, with a focus on Latin American Studies and Spanish, in 2003. In 2010, Young served as a multimedia reporting fellow at the University of California, Berkeley. She earned her master of fine arts in creative writing and was a GO-MAP Fellow at the University of Washington from 2010 to 2012.

== Career ==
Young started as a general assignment reporter intern for Time magazine, the Buenos Aires Herald, and the Miami Herald. For four years, she served as a business reporter and later political beat reporter for the Seattle Post-Intelligencer. She was the 2016-2019 board chair of InvestigateWest, a nonprofit newsroom which she co-founded.

While at The New York Times, Young contributed to "Snow Fall: The Avalanche at Tunnel Creek," which won the 2013 Pulitzer Prize in Feature Writing and a Peabody Award.

In 2018–19, she was the Prose Writer-in-Residence at Hugo House in Seattle, Washington. Young has written freelance articles for publications including The Washington Post and the Guardian. She has taught creative writing in English and Spanish at Hugo House, the Port Townsend Writers' Conference, and the Seattle Public Library. From 2020 to 2025, Young gave free and bilingual writing classes with the Humanities Washington Speakers Bureau.

== Writing ==
=== Books ===
Her debut novel, Subduction, was published by Red Hen Press in April 2020. It was reviewed in The Washington Post and selected as a staff pick by The Paris Review. Subduction won Nautilus and IPPY awards and was a finalist for two International Latino Book Awards and Foreword Indies Book of the Year.

Young's debut memoir, Desire Lines, is forthcoming from Red Hen Press in October 2026.

=== Essays ===
- “What are the chances?” anthologized in No Contact: Writers on Family Estrangement (Catapult, April 2026)
- “New Faith, Forgotten Soil” (wildness, December 2025)
- “On Hold” (Spark Magazine, November 2024)
- “Brainstorm” (Hostos Review/Revista Hostosiana, 2022; Young's reading of “Brainstorm” is archived by the Library of Congress PALABRA
- “How to Break Even” (Vol. I Brooklyn, September 2021)
- “The Inescapable Joys of Motherhood” anthologized in Alone Together: Love, Grief and Comfort in the Time of COVID-19[KMY8], winner of a 2021 Washington State Book Award
- “Our Lady of Perpetual Self-Loathing” (Fiction International, fall 2021)
- “This is not a metaphor” (The Rumpus, July 2021)
- "Every woman keeps a flame against the wind." (Proximity, November 2018), anthologized in Latina Outsiders: Remaking Latina Identity (Routledge, June 2019)
- "Follow Me" (City Arts Magazine, September 2018)
- "When a rideshare trip leads to fear and disgust" (Crosscut, January 2018)
- "On Being Driven" (Moss, October 2017)
- "Straight, No Chaser" anthologized in Pie & Whiskey (Sasquatch, October 2017)
- "A few thoughts while shaving" (Hobart, July 2017)

=== Journalism ===
As an investigative journalist, Young has specialized in reporting on topics such as the environment, missing and murdered indigenous women (MMIW), automation, education and social justice, gay rights, government malfeasance and corruption, climate change, worker's rights, and more. Since 2018, Young has contributed book reviews to The Washington Post Book World.

== Awards ==
Young earned the following awards as a contributing researcher for the New York Times team that produced Snow Fall: The Avalanche at Tunnel Creek

- American Society of Newspaper Editors (Punch Sulzberger Award for Online Storytelling, 2013)
- Pictures of the Year International (Best E-Project), 2013

Other awards

- Society of American Business Editors and Writers (Best in Business, General Excellence, 2007)
- Society of Professional Journalists' Pacific Northwest Chapter (Second Place for Comprehensive Coverage, 2007) and (First Place for Best Government Reporting, 2007, with Ruth Teichroeb; Best Online Business Adaption, 2006)
