= Rachel Lynn Solomon =

Romance and YA author

Rachel Lynn Solomon is an author of romance novels and young adult literature.

== Early life ==
Solomon is from Seattle, Washington. In her early adulthood, she worked at the KUOW-FM public radio station, which was the inspiration for her novel The Ex Talk.

== Career ==
Today Tonight Tomorrow, The Ex Talk, See You Yesterday, and Business or Pleasure have all received starred reviews from both Publishers Weekly and Kirkus Reviews.

Her romance novel Business or Pleasure was included in lists of the best romance novels of 2023 by The New York Times and Entertainment Weekly.

In 2021, her YA novel Today Tonight Tomorrow was a finalist for the Young Adult Literature Washington State Book Award and named a Notable Young Adult book in the Sydney Taylor Book Award. See You Yesterday and Past Present Future have appeared on The New York Times Best Sellers list for young adult hardcover books. See You Yesterday was also a finalist in the 2022 Cybils Award for Young Adult Speculative Fiction.

== Works ==
=== Adult fiction ===
- The Ex Talk (2021)
- Weather Girl (2022)
- Business or Pleasure (2023)
- What Happens in Amsterdam (2025)
- Extracurricular (2026)

=== Young adult fiction ===
- You'll Miss Me When I'm Gone (2018)
- Our Year of Maybe (2019)
- "Aftershocks", a short story in the anthology It's a Whole Spiel: Love, Latkes, and Other Jewish Stories (2019)
- Today Tonight Tomorrow (2020)
- We Can't Keep Meeting Like This (2021)
- See You Yesterday (2022)
- Past Present Future (2024)

== Personal life ==
Rachel Lynn Solomon has described being Jewish as a "vital piece" of her identity, and has included Jewish protagonists in many of her books because of positive reader reactions and a lack of Jewish characters in contemporary young adult fiction. She is married, and lives in Amsterdam.
