= Olivia Waite =

American writer

Olivia Waite is an American novelist who writes historical romance, fantasy and science fiction novels. She is also a literary reviewer, who has been monthly romance columnist for The Seattle Review of Books and romance fiction columnist for the New York Times Book Review.

The Lady's Guide to Celestial Mechanics (2019) was an imagined romance between two early-nineteenth-century women first encountering each other as collaborators in a scientific translation.

The Care and Feeding of Waspish Widows (2020), a novel within Waite's Feminine Pursuits series, was a 2020 winner of The Ripped Bodice's Awards for Excellence in Romance Fiction. It was also was a finalist in the fiction category for the 2021 Washington State Book Award.

Murder By Memory (2026) was a finalist for the 2026 Hugo Award for Best Novella.

== Works ==
- Damned If You Do. 2011
- Generous Fire. 2011.
- Hearts And Harbingers. 2011.
- Hell and Hellion. 2012..
- Color Me Bad. 2013.
- At His Countess' Pleasure. 2013.
- The Best Worst Holiday Party Ever. 2015.
- Happily Ever Afterlives. 2016.
- A Thief in the Nude. 2018.
- The Lady's Guide to Celestial Mechanics. 2019.
- The Care and Feeding of Waspish Widows: Feminine Pursuits. 2020.
- The Hellion's Waltz: Feminine Pursuits. 2021.
- Hen Fever: A Sapphic Victorian Romance. 2022.
- Murder by Memory. 2025.
- Nobody's Baby. 2026.
