= Doug Merlino =

American journalist

`Doug Merlino is an American writer and journalist.

== Personal history ==
Merlino grew up in Seattle, Washington and attended the Lakeside School. He studied government at Claremont McKenna College in Los Angeles, and received graduate degrees in journalism and international affairs from the University of California, Berkeley. He lived in Budapest, Hungary, where he worked as an editor at the Budapest Business Journal. He is married and now lives in the Hell's Kitchen neighborhood of New York City.

== Professional work ==
Merlino has worked for publications including Slate, Wired, Men's Journal, the Budapest Business Journal, and the Seattle Times. He reported on post-genocide reconciliation in Rwanda for the PBS show Frontline/World.

Merlino's first book, The Hustle: One Team and Ten Lives in Black and White, was published in January 2011. The nonfiction book tells the story of a basketball team that Merlino played on as a 14-year-old in the 1986. The team, an integration experiment, mixed privileged white players from Merlino's private school with African-American kids from Seattle's Central Area. The boys won an AAU championship that season, and the organizers began a program to enroll some of the black players in private schools.

Several years later Merlino learned that Tyrell Johnson, one of his African-American teammates, had been murdered and dismembered. This spurred him to track down the remaining players to find out what happened to them, and how they looked back at their team. They include a hedge fund manager, a Pentecostal preacher, a prosecutor, a frequently incarcerated cocaine addict, a winemaker, and a street hustler. The resulting book tells the story of these individuals, but also focuses on the shifting dynamics of race and class, manhood, education and gentrification over the last thirty years. Many of the players and coaches from the team reunited in January 2011 for a televised panel discussion that coincided with the release of the book.

Merlino's second full-length book, Beast: Blood, Struggle and Dreams at the Heart of Mixed Martial Arts was published in 2015. It details two years that Merlino spent following professional MMA fighters from elite American Top Team in Florida. The main fighters profiled include Jeff Monson, an American anarchist rising to fame on the Russian fight circuit; Daniel Straus, a Cincinnati native fighting his way toward a title shot after a stint in prison; Steve Mocco, an NCAA champion wrestler and Olympian attempting to make the transition to cage fighting; and Mirsad Bektic, a Bosnian refugee and one of the sport’s top prospects. The book was praised for its gritty realism in outlets ranging from No Holds Barred to the New York Times Book Review.

Merlino has also published an e-book, The Crossover: A Brief History of Basketball and Race, from James Naismith to Lebron James.

== Awards ==
Merlino received the 2011 Washington State Book Award in Biography/Memoir for The Hustle: One Team and Ten Lives in Black and White.
