= Joy McCullough =

American author of young adult fiction

- Education: Northwestern University
- Occupation: Author
- Writing career
- Genre: Young adult fiction
- Website: joymccullough.com

Joy McCullough is an American author of young adult fiction. She is best known for her verse novel Blood Water Paint. She lives in Seattle, Washington. She attended Northwestern University.

== Writing career ==
Blood Water Paint is a verse novel of biographical fiction for young adults. Its subject is Italian baroque painter Artemisia Gentileschi, who was raped and took her attacker to court. It is the tenth novel written by McCullough and it was the first of her books published. McCullough, whose background was as a playwright and not as a poet, first developed Blood Water Paint as a play that was produced in 2015. She read transcripts from the rape trial, which had been translated into English, in her research.

Blood Water Paint received starred reviews from Publishers Weekly and School Library Journal. The Horn Book called it "a powerful novel." Publishers Weekly wrote, "A haunting, stirring depiction of an unforgettable woman" and School Library Journal wrote, "McCullough’s beautifully crafted text will inspire upper-middle/high school readers to research the true story upon which this powerful piece of historical fiction is based. The poetry is clear and revelatory, exploring Artemisia’s passion for both art and life." Blood Water Paint was longlisted for National Book Foundation's 2018 National Book Award for Young People’s Literature. It was named one of the year's ten best historical fiction novels for youth by Booklist. The audiobook was read by Xe Sands.

In 2020, McCullough published A Field Guide for Getting Lost.

On March 8, 2022, Tess Sharpe, Caroline Tung Richmond, Jessica Spotswood and McCullough released the novel Great or Nothing, a retelling of the classic Little Women, set during the second World War.

== Selected works ==
- —— (2017). Blood Water Paint. Dutton.
- —— (2020). A Field Guide to Getting Lost. Atheneum.
- —— (2021). Across the Pond. Atheneum. ISBN 9781534471214.
- —— (2022). Not Starring Zadie Louise. Atheneum. ISBN 9781534496231.
- —— (2023). Code Red. Atheneum. ISBN 9781534496286.

=== Picture books ===
- —— (2021). Champ and Major: First Dogs. Illustrated by Sheyda Abvabi Best. Dial Books. ISBN 9780593407141.
- —— (2022). Harriet's Ruffled Feathers. Illustrated by Romina Galotta. Atheneum. ISBN 9781534486768.
- —— (2023). The Story of a Book. Illustrated by Devon Holzwarth. Atheneum.

=== Collaborations ===
- —— (2022). Great or Nothing. With Caroline Tung Richmond, Tess Sharpe, and Jessica Spotswood. Delacorte. ISBN 9780593372593.
