= Susan Rich =

American poet

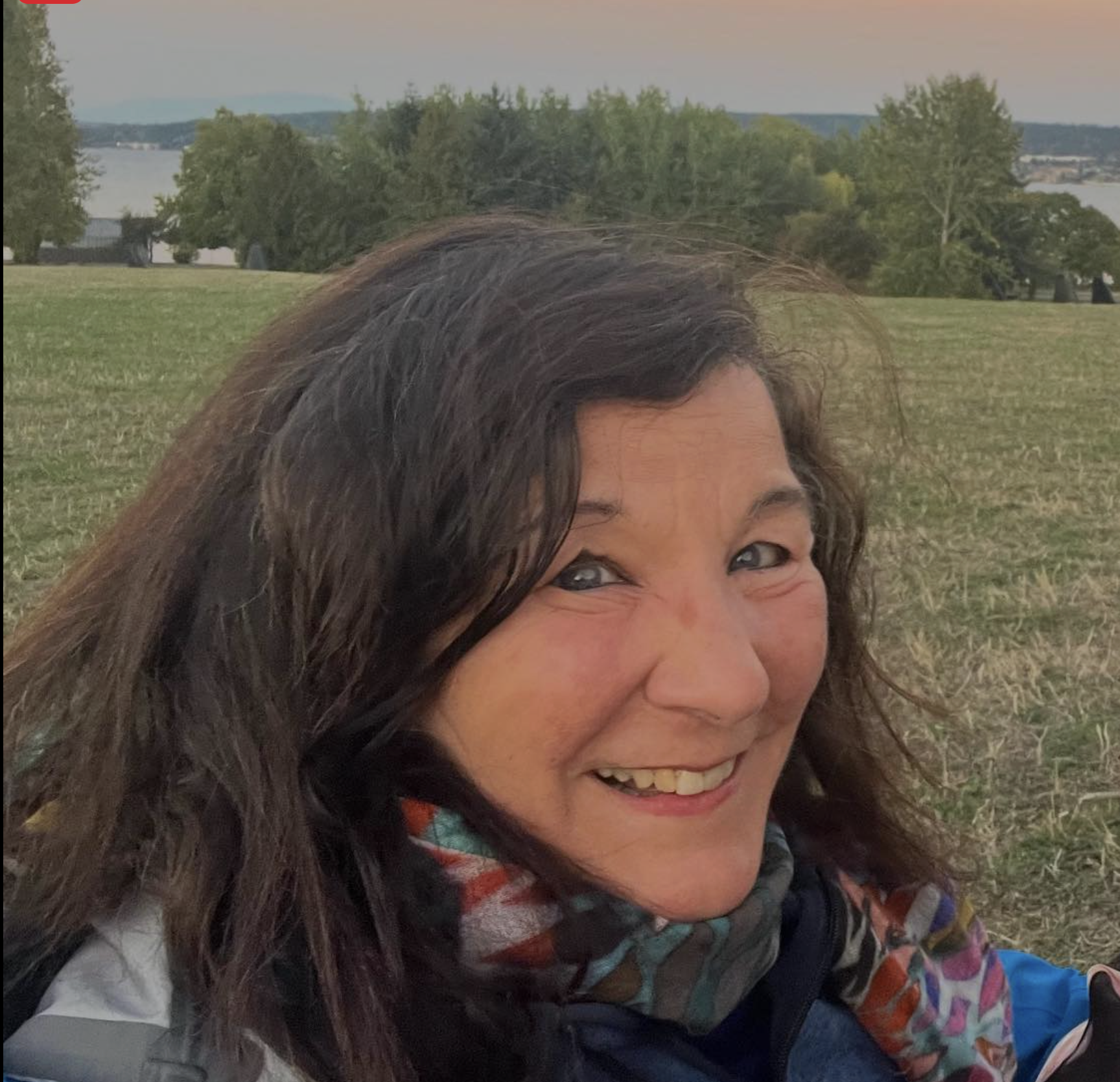
- Born: Boston, Massachusetts, U.S.
- Education: University of Massachusetts Amherst (BA); Harvard University (MEd); University of Oregon (MFA)
- Occupations: Poet, professor, activist
- Writing career
- Genres: Poetry, ekphrasis
- Notable works: The Cartographer’s Tongue, Blue Atlas
- Notable awards: PEN USA Award for Poetry, Fulbright Fellowship

Susan Rich is an American poet, editor, and human rights activist based in Seattle, Washington. She is the author of six poetry collections and is a recipient of the PEN USA Award for Poetry.

== Early life and education ==
Rich was born in Boston and raised in Brookline. She is the sister of B. Ruby Rich, a film critic and scholar. She earned her B.A. in creative writing from the University of Massachusetts Amherst and a Master of international and comparative education from Harvard University. She later completed her MFA at the University of Oregon.

== Career ==
=== Humanitarian activism ===
Prior to her teaching career, Rich spent a decade in the international humanitarian sector. She served as a Peace Corps volunteer in Niger and worked for Amnesty International. She has described her experiences as an electoral supervisor in Bosnia and Herzegovina and a human rights trainer in Gaza and the West Bank as central themes in her writing from this time.

=== Poetry and academia ===
Rich is an instructor at Highline College in Des Moines, Washington. Her poetry is sometimes noted returning to themes of travel and cartography, and her 2024 collection, Blue Atlas, explores reproductive choice and trauma through a surrealist lens. In addition, she has worked in the poetic genre of ekphrasis.

== Bibliography ==
=== Poetry collections ===
- The Cartographer’s Tongue: Poems of the World. White Pine Press, 2000. ISBN 978-1893996069
- Cures Include Travel. White Pine Press, 2006. ISBN 978-1893996458
- The Alchemist’s Kitchen. White Pine Press, 2010. ISBN 978-1935210139
- Cloud Pharmacy. White Pine Press, 2014. ISBN 978-1935210566
- Gallery of Postcards and Maps: New and Selected Poems. Salmon Poetry, 2022. ISBN 978-1915022134
- Blue Atlas. Red Hen Press, 2024. ISBN 978-1636281360

=== Edited volumes ===
- The Strangest of Theatres: Poets Writing Across Borders (2013) (Co-edited with Ilya Kaminsky and Brian Turner)
- Demystifying the Manuscript (2023) (Co-edited with Kelli Russell Agodon)

== Awards and honors ==
- PEN USA Award for Poetry (2001)
- Fulbright Fellowship (South Africa)
- Times Literary Supplement Award (London)
- Artist Trust Fellowship
