= Brenda Miller =

American post-minimalist visual artist

Brenda Miller (born 1941) is an American post-minimalist visual artist. She has shown her work in the 1973 Whitney Biennial, as well as eight exhibitions at the Museum of Modern Art. Born in the Bronx, she studied at Parsons and University of New Mexico, and received and MFA from Tulane University in 1967, before moving back to New York City. Miller’s work was included in the 1971 exhibition Twenty Six Contemporary Women Artists held at The Aldrich Contemporary Art Museum and the 2022 exhibition 52 Artists: A Feminist Milestone also at the Aldrich. She received three National Endowment for the Arts Fellowships (1976, 1979, and 1987). Her work is in the collections of the Smithsonian American Art Museum, Whitney Museum of American Art, Museum Boijmans Van Beuningen, and the Harvard Art Museums.
