= Sonya Lea =

American essayist, memoirist, film director, and screenwriter

Sonya Lea (born January 12, 1960) is an American essayist, memoirist, film director, and screenwriter, based in Seattle.

== Career ==
Lea has written pieces for media outlets such as Salon and The Southern Review. In 2015, Lea published Wondering Who You Are through Tin House. The work is a memoir about her experiences with her husband losing his memory of their life together. The book received positive reviews from media outlets such as Booklist, Oprah.com, and the Chicago Tribune.

In 2014, Lea released Every Beautiful Thing, a short film that starred Lauren Weedman. Lea was a finalist for the Emerging Director Award at the Post Alley Film Festival and the movie's score, which was done by Trey Gunn, won an award for best score at the Moondance International Film Festival.

She also works as a teacher at the Hugo House and is active with the Red Badge Project, where she teaches writing to female service members and veterans.

== Personal life ==
Lea is married to Richard Bandy. The two met at a high school dance while they were both in their teens and they married years later. In 2000 Bandy developed pseudomyxoma peritonei, a form of cancer that caused tumors to form in his abdomen. He underwent multiple surgeries, the last of which in 2003 resulted in internal bleeding. The bleeding was extensive enough that it caused brain damage, resulting in Bandy losing most of his memories of the last twenty years. Bandy was able to remember some basic details like his wife's name, but could not remember details about his current life such as his job, children, or his marriage. He also experienced changes to his personality and handwriting.
