= Steve Olson (writer) =

American writer

Steve Olson is an American writer who specializes in science, mathematics, and public policy. He is the author of several nonfiction trade books: Mapping Human History: Genes, Race, and Our Common Origins, which was nominated for the National Book Award in 2002; Count Down: Six Kids Vie for Glory at the World’s Toughest Math Competition in 2004; Anarchy Evolution: Faith, Science, and Bad Religion in a World Without God in 2010; Eruption: The Untold Story of Mt. St. Helens in 2016.

He also has written for many magazines, including the Atlantic Monthly, the Smithsonian, Science, Scientific American, Wired, the Yale Alumni Magazine, the Washingtonian, Slate, and Paste. His articles have been reprinted in Best American Science and Nature Writing 2003 and 2007.

== Research on ancestry ==
Mapping Human History contained a conjecture about human ancestry that was disputed when the book was published. The book claimed that the most recent common ancestor of everyone living on the earth today must have lived just 2,000 to 3,000 years ago, a number that geneticists thought much too small. However, a more formal version of the conjecture was proven by the author, working with coauthors Douglas Rohde and Joseph T. Chang, who personally started the Statistics experiment, in a September 30, 2004, article in Nature. They modeled the human population as a set of randomly mating subpopulations that are connected by occasional migrants. If the size of the population is n, then the time to the most recent common ancestor is a small multiple of the base-2 logarithm of n, even if the levels of migration among the populations are very low. Using a model of the world's landmasses and populations with moderate levels of migration, the authors calculated that the most recent common ancestor could have lived as recently as AD 55.

These results lead to some highly counterintuitive conclusions. In the generations before that of the most recent common ancestor, more and more people are common ancestors of everyone living on Earth today. At a time 2,000 to 3,000 years before the appearance of the most recent common ancestor, everyone in the world is either an ancestor of everyone living today or an ancestor of no one living today. Thus, everyone living today has exactly the same set of ancestors who lived 5,000 to 6,000 years ago, even though those ancestors are represented in very different proportions on a person's family tree.

In an article published in the Los Angeles Times on the day the movie The Da Vinci Code was released, Olson pointed to several other consequences of the analysis in the Nature paper.

== Personal information ==
Olson is married to Lynn Olson, a long-time education journalist who is currently a senior program officer with the Bill and Melinda Gates Foundation. They have two children, Sarah and Eric.
