= Jack Nisbet (writer) =

American naturalist

Jack Nisbet is a teacher, naturalist, and writer who lives in Spokane, Washington with his wife and two children. He grew up in North Carolina, graduated from Stanford University, and moved to Stevens County, Washington, in 1971 where he wrote a column for The Chewelah Independent.

== Works ==
- Sources of the River: Tracking David Thompson Through the Inland Northwest (Sasquatch Books, 1994).
- Visible Bones: The Natural and Human Forces that Transformed the West (Sasquatch Books, 2004).
- The Mapmaker's Eye: David Thompson on the Columbia Plateau (Washington State University Press, 2005).
- The Collector: David Douglas and the Natural History of the Northwest (Sasquatch Books, 2009). ISBN 1-57061-613-2
- Ancient Places (Sasquatch Books, 2015), ISBN 978-1-57061-980-9
