= Maria Guarnaschelli =

American cookbook editor and publisher (1941–2021)

- Born: Maria Albano DiBenedetto; April 18, 1941; Brookline, Massachusetts, U.S.
- Died: February 6, 2021 (aged 79); Manhasset, New York, U.S.
- Education: Emmanuel College; Yale University
- Occupations: Cookbook editor and publisher
- Children: Alex Guarnaschelli

Maria Guarnaschelli (née Maria Albano DiBenedetto; April 18, 1941 – February 6, 2021) was an American cookbook editor and publisher. In a career spanning five decades she worked with and groomed popular food authors including Rose Levy Beranbaum, Rick Bayless, Julie Sahni, Fuchsia Dunlop, J. Kenji López-Alt, and Judy Rodgers. Some of the notable cookbooks published by her included Classical Indian Cooking, All New All Purpose Joy of Cooking, The Food Lab, The Zuni Cafe Cookbook, and The Cake Bible. Her works were noted to have contributed to a change in how cookbooks were produced, and also credited with introducing American households and chefs to international cuisines beyond just European cuisines.

== Early life ==
Maria Guarnaschelli was born on April 18, 1941, in Brookline, Massachusetts, to Horatia Alice (née Peabody) and George DiBenedetto. Her father was a refrigerator salesperson, and her mother was a homemaker.

She studied at the Emmanuel College in Boston, and went on to complete her master's degree from Yale University majoring in Russian literature.

== Career ==
Guarnaschelli started her publishing career with Scribner's and later with William Morrow before joining W. W. Norton & Company in 2000, where she would go on to become a vice president and serve until her retirement in 2017. She was also a consulting editor for the American food magazine Saveur.

Over her career, she was recognized as a cookbook publishing pioneer and groomed multiple authors, with many of them going on to win awards including the James Beard Foundation Award and the International Association of Culinary Professional awards. Some of the notable books that she edited and published included those that brought international cuisine to American households, including the first cookbook she edited, Classic Indian Cooking (1980) by Julie Sahni, which The New York Times credited as "the first comprehensive Indian cookbook for American kitchens." Other cookbooks she edited included those on Mexican cuisine by Rick Bayless and Chinese cuisine by Fuchsia Dunlop. Some other culinary writers with whom she had worked include J. Kenji López-Alt with The Food Lab, Judy Rodgers with The Zuni Cafe Cookbook, Maricel Presilla with Gran Cocina Latina, and Rose Levy Beranbaum with The Cake Bible.

One of Guarnaschelli's more ambitious projects was the seventh edition of Irma S. Rombauer's 1931 classic Joy of Cooking, an originally self-published book which was the best-selling cookbook in US history at the time. With a budget of $5 million, she embarked on an ambitious task to rewrite the book for the late 1990s. She recruited over 130 chefs across cuisine styles to develop a modernized version of the book. The book had a comprehensive rewrite with 4500 recipes and less than 50 remaining the same from the original, and was published as All New All Purpose Joy of Cooking in 1997. The book had a mixed reception with some reviews praising the book, calling it "complete" and "functional", but some critics said that the book was "joyless" and had a "corporate" approach. Rombauer's granddaughter Marion Rombauer said that Becker's family dissociated themselves from the book. The book and its subsequent reprints continues to remain popular and is still considered a standard presence in American kitchens.

In a career spanning five decades, Guarnaschelli was known for bringing a rigorous approach to the testing of and quality of recipes, preferring accuracy over ease of preparation, and she pushed cookbook authors to think beyond the French and Italian cuisines familiar to most Americans. Her books contributed to the change in how home cooking was perceived; over the time she was active, home cooking moved from being simply a daily chore to a hobby and "cultural touchstone" for many home cooks. Some of the books she edited contained recipes that required days of preparation, as opposed to many cookbooks of the time which marketed themselves as having easy and simple recipes in order to sell more easily.

Guarnaschelli also edited works of nonfiction other than food related books, working with academic authors including Deborah Tannen on You Just Don't Understand, considered a seminal work on gender studies and linguistics, John Cacioppo on Loneliness, Steven Pinker on The Language Instinct, and David D. Burns' self-help best seller Feeling Good: The New Mood Therapy, as Burns later mentioned in another book.

== Personal life ==
Guarnaschelli (then DiBenedetto) met her husband, John Guarnaschelli, who was then a history professor, when she was studying at the Yale University. Her husband died in 2018. Their daughter is the New York-based chef Alex Guarnaschelli.

She died on February 6, 2021, at the Northwell Health Stern Family Center in Manhasset, New York, from heart disease and related complications. She was 79.
