= E. J. Koh =

American poet, author, and translator of Korean literature

E.J. Koh
- Born: 1988 (age 37–38); San Jose, California
- Education: University of California, Irvine (BA); Columbia University (MFA); University of Washington (PhD)
- Occupations: Writer, translator, poet
- Awards: NEA Fellowship (2023); Young Lions Fiction Award (2024)
- Website: www.ejkoh.com

- E. J. Koh
- Hangul: 고은지
- RR: Go Eunji
- MR: Ko Ŭnji

E. J. Koh (Korean: 고은지) is an American poet, author, and translator of Korean literature. Her memoir, The Magical Language of Others, received the 2021 Washington State Book Award and the 2021 Pacific Northwest Book Award. Koh's debut novel, The Liberators, won the 2024 Young Lions Fiction Award.

== Early life and education ==
Koh was born in 1988 in San Jose, California. She holds a BA in English from the University of California, Irvine. She earned an MFA in Creative Writing and Literary Translation at Columbia University and completed her PhD in English Language and Literature at the University of Washington, where she studied Korean American literature, history, and film.

== Career ==
Koh's poems, stories, and essays have appeared in AGNI, The Atlantic, Boston Review, The Los Angeles Review of Books, Poetry, Slate, Teen Vogue, World Literature Today, and elsewhere. She is the co-translator, alongside Marci Calabretta Cancio-Bello, of Yi Won’s poetry collection The World’s Lightest Motorcycle, which won the 2022 Literature Translation Institute of Korea’s Translation Grand Prize.

Koh's memoir, The Magical Language of Others, published in 2020, weaves the stories of four generations of women in Koh's family. Interspersed with letters exchanged between mother and daughter, the text illustrates how language ties them together. It won the 2022 Association for Asian American Studies Book Award and was longlisted for the 2021 PEN/Open Book Award.

Her poetry collection, A Lesser Love, was published by LSU Press in 2017 and won the Pleiades Press Editors Prize.

Koh is the recipient of 2020 The Virginia Faulkner Award for Excellence in Writing from Prairie Schooner. She has received fellowships from the American Literary Translators Association, Jack Straw Writers Program, Kundiman, MacDowell Colony, Napa Valley Writers' Conference, and Vermont Studio Center.

Koh received a 2023 National Endowment of the Arts Fellowship for Poetry.

Her debut novel, The Liberators, won the 2024 Young Lions Fiction Award from the New York Public Library. It was a finalist for the 2024 Washington State Book Award and shortlisted for the 2025 Pacific Northwest Book Award. Kirkus Reviews gave the novel a starred review, "Koh’s poetic prose delights with surprising metaphors and a cast of skillfully rendered characters. A mesmerizing, delicately crafted novel about survival in the wake of civil war and transpacific imperialism."

== Bibliography ==
=== Novel ===
- The Liberators. Tin House. 2023. ISBN 9780593863794.

=== Nonfiction ===
- The Magical Language of Others. Tin House. 2020. ISBN 9781951142278.

=== Poetry Collection ===
- A Lesser Love. LSU Press. 2017. ISBN 9780807167779.

=== Select Poems ===
- "Korean War", The Seattle Review of Books (October 2015)
- "Alki The Town of Dreams", Zócalo Public Square (September 2016)
- "Icicle Creek", Boston Review (February 2017)
- "American Han", Poetry (October 2021)
- "Pondfields", Poetry (October 2021)
- "This Birthday", Poem-A-Day (October 2024)
