= Panucci =

Panucci may refer to:

- Christian Panucci, Italian footballer
- Penuche (Italian: Panucci), fudge-like candy
