= Plume (poetry collection) =

2012 poetry collection by Kathleen Flenniken

- Author: Kathleen Flenniken
- Language: English
- Series: Pacific Northwest Poetry Series
- Subject: Richland, Washington; Hanford Nuclear Reservation
- Genre: Poetry
- Publisher: University of Washington Press
- Publication date: February 15, 2012
- Publication place: United States
- Media type: Print
- Pages: 80 (hardcover)
- Awards: Washington State Book Award (winner); Pacific Northwest Booksellers Association Award (finalist); William Carlos Williams Award (finalist)
- ISBN: 978-0295991535
- OCLC: 820652387
- Dewey Decimal: 811/.6
- LC Class: PS3606.L47P58 2012

Plume is a collection of poetry, written by Kathleen Flenniken. Published in 2012 by the University of Washington Press, the poetry presents a brief history of Richland, Washington and the Hanford Nuclear Reservation. The author examines the actions of the US Department of Energy regarding the establishment and operation of Hanford, a nuclear production facility and how their actions affected the health of individuals and families living and working in or near the Reservation. While the US government assured the employees and families who lived in the area that they were safe from exposure to radioactive materials, declassified documents revealed that early protective measures were inadequate, while people were dying of radiation-induced illness. The book was a finalist for both the William Carlos Williams Award from the Poetry Society of America and the Pacific Northwest Booksellers Association Award, while it was the recipient of the Washington State Book Award in 2013.

== Overview ==
Kathleen Flenniken grew up in Richland, Washington, located on the Columbia River in south central Washington state. Plume shares her family's experience living near and working at the Hanford Nuclear Reservation toward the end of the Cold War. During her childhood, her father worked as a doctoral chemist at Hanford. As an adult, Flenniken herself earned two degrees in engineering and worked at Hanford as a civil engineer and hydrologist. In addition to her personal story, she writes about her friends and members of the community and how the radiation exposure at Hanford affected their lives. Flenniken describes the book as a collection of poems about "growing up innocent in a contaminated land".

Established in 1943 as part of the Manhattan Project, the Hanford Nuclear Reservation was home to the B Reactor, the first full-scale plutonium production reactor in the world. Plutonium manufactured there was used in Fat Man, the atomic bomb detonated over Nagasaki, Japan. During the Cold War, the project was expanded to include nine nuclear reactors and five large plutonium processing complexes, which produced plutonium for most of the more than 60,000 weapons in the US nuclear arsenal. Scientists at the site made several technological advancements, due to the rapid development of nuclear technology. The involvement of the Italian physicist Enrico Fermi, who oversaw the design of the B Reactor at Hanford. The work of Manhattan Project health physicist Herbert Parker is presented in the chapter and poetry entitled "Herb Parker Feels Like Dancing".

Contrary to declarations made by government officials, declassified documents revealed that the early safety procedures and waste disposal practices were inadequate, releasing significant amounts of radioactive materials into the air and the Columbia River, threatening the health and lives of residents in the area. Overall, the culture of secrecy and deception permeated the Hanford site, with the Department of Energy keeping the effects of radiation from the public, which resulted in a sense of betrayal on behalf of the employees and people living in the area. In the late 1980s, decades of environmental contamination and deception at the plutonium production facility were revealed, as community residents, employees, and family members were dying of radiation-induced illness. As of 2013, Hanford remains the site of the world's largest environmental cleanup effort, the financial impact of which includes the cost of building and operating a $12.2 billion waste treatment plant, while continuing to leak radioactive waste into the environment.

== Honors and awards ==
- Pacific Northwest Booksellers Association Award (finalist)
- William Carlos Williams Award from the Poetry Society of America (finalist)
- Washington State Book Award (winner)

== Reception ==
Reviews and articles about Plume have appeared in regional and national newspapers and magazines, including The Seattle Times, Crosscut.com, Mid-American Review, The Georgia Review, Orion, Rain Taxi, Washington State Magazine, and City Living Seattle. It was selected by Linda Bierds of the University of Washington to be included in the Pacific Northwest Poetry Series. The book was on the short list for the Pacific Northwest Booksellers Association Award and was named a finalist for the Poetry Society of America's William Carlos Williams Award. In 2013, it was honored as the recipient of the Washington State Book Award.

Some of the feedback the Plume received focused on the subject of the book itself. Mary Ann Gwinn of The Seattle Times wrote that "[m]any of the poems wrestle with the bomb factory's legacy of environmental contamination, illness and even death from exposure to radiation. But she also wrote them to honor the people she grew up with." Jeannine Hall Gailey of The Rumpus remarked that the work is "[n]ot only an education about Washington State and its role in the Nuclear Age but of an awakening in the American public as well as the poet herself to the peculiar dangers of invisible poisons and of trusting too much the authorities." John Bradley of Rain Taxi stated that the work encompasses "quiet but damning poems on the history of the Hanford Nuclear Reservation".

Susan Somers-Willett of the Orion magazine praised for Flenniken for her ability to present generative art in literature, particularly juxtaposing documentary poetry with journalistic objectivity. Martha Collins, poet and author of Blue Front and White Papers, lauded Flenniken's ability to "deftly" present the "timely and important subject matter as well as the meticulous craft of its poems". Speaking of her writing style, Bradley of Rain Taxi says, "Flenniken wisely lets the reader gradually uncover her betrayal, and ours." Mike Dillon of City Living Seattle stated "When it aims to, poetry can treat history in ways history books or photographs cannot: It drops us in our human skin into another time and place like no other medium. Plume is difficult to put down and difficult to forget."
