= Donna Barba Higuera =

American children's book author

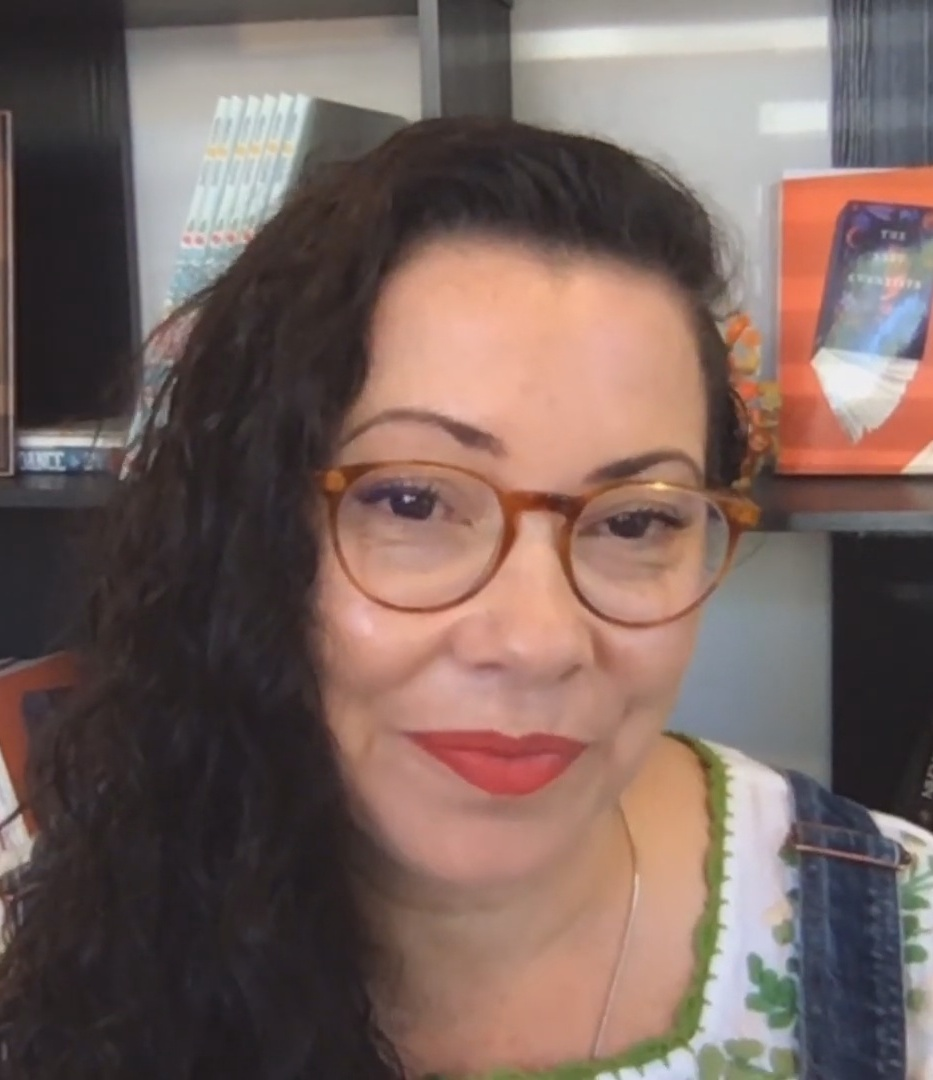
- Writing career
- Notable works: Lupe Wong Won't Dance; The Last Cuentista
- Notable awards: Newbery Medal (2022); Pura Belpré Award (2022)
- Website: dbhiguera.com

Donna Barba Higuera is an American children's book author. Her debut novel, Lupe Wong Won't Dance, was a Pura Belpré Award honor book and PNBA winner in 2021. Her middle grade dystopian novel, The Last Cuentista, won the 2022 Newbery Medal and the Pura Belpré Medal.

== Biography ==
Donna grew up in Central California, surrounded by agricultural and oil fields. As a child, she could be found reading a good book. Her favorite hobbies were calling dial-a-story over and sneaking into cemeteries to inspire her spooky tales using the headstones.

Donna's Middle Grade and Picture Books are about kids who find themselves in odd or scary situations. She explores themes such as: language and cultural differences and living a biracial life. Donna likes to write about all things funny, but also sad, and creepy, and magical.

Donna lives in Washington State with her family, three dogs and two frogs. Outside of writing, Higuera works in healthcare.

== Selected works ==
=== Lupe Wong Won't Dance (2020) ===
Lupe Wong Won't Dance is a middle-grade sports novel published September 8, 2020 by Levine Querido. Mason London illustrated the cover, and Libia Brenda translated the Spanish-language edition.

Summary of the book: Lupe Wong is determined to be the first female pitcher in the Major Leagues. She’s also championed notable causes and trivial issues like expanding the options for race on school tests beyond just a few bubbles or complaining to the BBC about the gap between Doctor Who seasons. She needed an A grade in all her classes in order to meet Fu Li Hernandez.

=== The Last Cuentista (2021) ===
The Last Cuentista was published by Levine Querido and edited by Nick Thomas. In Higuera's novel, 12-year-old Petra Peña and her family are among those chosen to escape Earth before Halley's Comet collides with the planet;she will have to leave many things behind like her home, her friends, and of course her Abuelita or Grandmother. However, after waking up from a 357-year sleep, everyone's memories had been erased except Petra's. Previous Newbery winner Tae Keller said The Last Cuentista

“certainly veers into the dark end of middle-grade fiction, with brainwashing, ‘purging’, and, yes, the destruction of our entire planet ... but it doesn’t dwell in the darkness, preferring to give its readers healthy doses of hope, wonder and page-turning action.”

The inspiration for The Last Cuentista came from a writing exercise involving the fairy tale "The Princess and the Pea".

== Awards and honors ==
The Spanish-language translation of Lupe Wong Won't Dance (Lupe Wong No Baila) and The Last Cuentista are Junior Library Guild books.

Booklist included Lupe Wong Won't Dance on their 2021 lists of the top ten "Best Middle-Grade Debuts" and "Best Sports Books for Youth."

The Last Cuentista was named one of the best children's books of the year by BookPage, The Boston Globe, the Chicago Public Library, Kirkus Reviews, the New York Public Library, Publishers Weekly, School Library Journal, TIME, and The Wall Street Journal.

Awards for Higuera's writing
Year	Title	Award	Result	Ref.
2020	Lupe Wong Won't Dance	ALSC Notable Children's Books	Selection	
2020	Lupe Wong Won't Dance	Booklist Editors' Choice: Books for Youth	Selection	
2021	Lupe Wong Won't Dance	PNBA Book Award	Winner	
2021	Lupe Wong Won't Dance	Pura Belpré Award for Children's Author	Honor	
2021	Lupe Wong Won't Dance	Sid Fleischman Humor Award	Winner	
2021	The Last Cuentista	Cybils Award for Elementary and Middle Grade Speculative Fiction	Finalist	
2022	The Last Cuentista	Newbery Medal	Winner	
2022	The Last Cuentista	Pura Belpré Award for Children's Author	Winner	
2024	Alebrijes	Pura Belpré Award for Children's Author	Honor	
2026	Zeta-1: année zéro	Prix Armand Giraud Saint-Jean-d'Hermine	Winner	

- Lupe Wong Won't Dance (Levine Querido, 2020)
- El Cucuy Is Scared, Too!, illustrated by Juliana Perdomo (Abrams, 2021)
  - ¡El Cucuy también tiene miedo! (expected 2023)
- The Last Cuentista (Levine Querido, 2021)
  - La última cuentista, translated by Aurora Humarán (Levine Querido, 2022)
- The Yellow Handkerchief, illustrated by Cynthia Alonso (Abrams, 2023)
- Alebrijes (Levine Querido)
- It's Navidad, El Cucuy!, illustrated by Juliana Perdomo (2023)
