= Young-Oak Lee =

South Korean scholar (born 1946)

- Born: 1946 (age 79–80)
- Education: Ewha Womans University; Korea University; University of Hawaiʻi at Mānoa
- Occupations: Literary scholar and critic
- Writing career
- Notable works: Gender and History: Understanding Ethnic Minority Literature in America; American Fiction and a Sense of Community: Robert Penn Warren, Tony Morrison, Chang-rae Lee

Young-Oak Lee (Korean: 이영옥; Hanja: 李英玉; born 1946) is a South Korean scholar, literary critic, and academic figure in the field of English literature and humanities. Lee is a professor emeritus of English Language and Literature of College of Liberal Arts at Sungkyunkwan University.

== Life and education ==
Young-Oak Lee was born in Seoul, South Korea in 1946. She graduated from Ewha Womans University with a bachelor's degree in English language and literature. She then studied at Korea University where she wrote her MA thesis on the theme and structure in Wuthering Heights. After completing her master's degree at Korea University in 1971, she received scholarship from East–West Center in Hawaiʻi, and earned her doctorate in American studies from University of Hawaiʻi at Mānoa in 1977.

== Academic career ==
In 1980, Lee became a professor of English language and literature at Sungkyunkwan University. In 1983, she received research funding from American Council of Learned Societies (ACLS) and had the opportunity to study W. Faulkner at the University of North Carolina (Chapel Hill). In 1986, she worked as an assistant professor at Chapman University in the United States and as a visiting professor at the University of North Carolina. In 1996, her research on English literature was funded by Yonam Foundation and she could study in the United Kingdom as a visiting professor at the University of Manchester. In the same year, she received residential visiting professorship in Waseda University in Tokyo, Japan. In 2012, Lee became a Professor Emeritus of English Language and Literature at Sungkyunkwan University. Her academic books include Gender and History: Understanding Ethnic Minority Literature in America (2005), which discusses the works of American writers who have their biological, cultural, and historical roots in various nations such as India, Africa, China, Japan, and Korea. Also, Lee published the book American Fiction and a Sense of Community: Robert Penn Warren, Tony Morrison, Chang-rae Lee (2016), which deals with literary works to examine the making of America's community consciousness by analyzing its historical and cultural backgrounds.

Lee played a major role in the academic circles of humanities by taking various leadership positions; she was the 26th president of the English Language and Literature Association of Korea (ELLAK), the 5th President of the Korean Association of Modern Fiction in English and the Korean Association for Feminist Studies in English Literature. In August 2011, Lee received the SKKU Teaching Award from Sungkyunkwan University for outstanding contribution in enhancing the quality of higher education. In 2012, she was awarded Geunjungpojang (근정포장; 勤政褒章) by the South Korean government, which is a Service Merit Medal given to a person who has contributed to the welfare of the people by working strenuously as a public official, a university professor, or an employee of public and social organizations. In 2019, at the 9th Proud Korean National Awards held at the Korea Press Center, Lee received the prize in the category of community service. In 2017, she was appointed as the 7th President of Ahn Junggeun Memorial Museum by Ministry of Patriots and Veterans Affairs in South Korea. Chosun Daily reports that her term of office is three years.

In her review of the book Gender and History: Understanding Ethnic Minority Literature in America, Eun-sook Koo, the professor of English Language and Literature in Cheongju University, criticizes Lee's evaluation of Claudia in Toni Morrison's The Bluest Eye. Although Koo acknowledges that Lee's comparative research would deepen readers’ understanding of American literature, she argues that Emerson's ego is too white male-centered to identify Claudia as an Emerson-like figure, who destroys dolls as a gesture of challenge and rejection to existing values. Additionally, as to Lee's analysis of Pecola's tragedy in The Bluest Eye, Koo criticizes that the historical fact of black people's movement to southern cities should be mentioned to explicate the collapse of Pecola's family and community.

== Works ==
=== Gender and History: Understanding Ethnic Minority Literature in America ===
According to the book Gender and History: Understanding Ethnic Minority Literature in America (2005), ethnic minority literature is contrasted to European white literature in that the term collectively refers to non-mainstream, Native American, African American, and Asian American literature. Lee's work examines the literature of disadvantaged races in American society by analyzing their position against the dominant, white American immigration groups. The objects and themes of Lee's literary criticism are as listed: L. M. Silko's Ceremony (themes: the recovery of decolonization process and indigenous thoughts); T. Morrison's The Bluest Eye (themes: the tragedy of white-led values in a black society and colonial female self); M. H. Kingston's China Men and The Woman Warrior (themes: the Chinese version of the discovery of the American continent and the voices of ecofeminists); N. Keller's Comfort Women (themes: the representation of the history of sexual slavery and women as historians). In her book, Lee examines H. Yamamoto's historical consciousness and aesthetics by analyzing immigrant society and its patriarchal oppression depicted in his works.

=== American Fiction and a Sense of Community: Robert Penn Warren, Tony Morrison, Chang-rae Lee ===
In her book American Fiction and a Sense of Community: Robert Penn Warren, Tony Morrison, Chang-rae Lee (2016), she investigated the formation of America's community consciousness by examining the historical and cultural background of immigrants depicted in American literature. The objects and themes of Lee's criticism are as follows: Robert Penn Warren's All the King's Men (themes: the southern states of the US and the making of its sense of community); Toni Morrison's The Bluest Eye, Sula, and Beloved (themes: black Americans' historical consciousness and their restoration of communities); various literary works by Theresa Hak Kyung Cha, Nora Okja Keller, and Chang-rae Lee's Native Speaker (themes: the significations of language and history). Here, Lee provides an in-depth analysis of the history of Asian immigration and discusses the vision of pluralistic societies depicted in Korean American writers’ literary works, which is further elaborated in her interview with Chang-rae Lee in the appendix.

== Major publications ==
=== Authored books ===
- A study of language development in Korean children [한국 어린이의 언어발달 연구]. Seoul Language Education. 1982. This book is co-authored by Seung-sin Ahn and Yeong-suk Lee.
- Gender and History: Understanding Ethnic Minority Literature in America [젠더와 역사: 미국소수인종문학의 이해]. Seoul: Thaehaksa. 2005. ISBN 978-89-7626-984-3.
- American Fiction and a Sense of Community: Robert Penn Warren, Tony Morrison, Chang-rae Lee [미국소설과 공동체 의식: 로버트 펜 워런·토니 모리슨·창래 리]. Seoul: Sechang Publishing. 2016. ISBN 978-89-8411-610-8.

=== Selected essays ===
- "The Myth of Southern Womanhood: A Study of In This Our Life and The Sound and the Fury." The Journal of English Language and Literature. 31(1): pages 97–116. 1985.
- "Articles: Mother-Daughter in Morrison and Keller: Revising Hawthorne's Legacy?" Journal of American Studies. 31(2): pages 443–453. 1999.
- "The Magus: John Fowles's Portrait of the Artist." The Journal of English Language and Literature. 46(3): pages 763–786. 2000.
- "Teaching Multiethnic Literatures of the United States to Korean Students: Language, Gender, and History." The Journal of English Language and Literature. 48(4): pages 1005–1026. 2002.
- "Asian American Literature: Its Significance." The Journal of English Language and Literature. 50(3): pages 619–637. 2004.
- "Gender, Race, and the Nation in A Gesture Life." Critique. 46(2): pages 146–159. 2005.
- “Articles: New Directions in Teaching English Literature to Non-Natives of English in Asia.” The Journal of English Language and Literature. 54(6): pages 917–932. 2008.
- "Transcending Ethnicity: Diasporicity in A Gesture Life." Journal of Asian American Studies. 12(1): pages 65–81. 2009.

=== Interviews ===
- "Nora Okja Keller and the Silenced Woman: An Interview." Melus. 28(4): pages 145–165. 2003.
- "Language and identity: an interview with Chang-rae Lee." Amerasia journal. 30(1): pages 215–227. 2004.
- "An Interview with Margaret Drabble." Contemporary literature. 48(4): pages 477–498. 2007.

=== Translations ===
- Wiebe, Robert H. (1999) [1996]. Self-rule: A Cultural History of American Democracy. Paju: Hanwool. ISBN 978-89-460-2650-6. This book is co-translated with Inchan Park and Honglim Ryu.
- Warren, Robert Penn (2019) [1996]. Brother to Dragons: A Tale in Verse and Voices. Seoul: Sungkyunkwan University Press. ISBN 979-11-5550-310-2.
