= The Last Cuentista =

2021 middle-grade novel by Donna Barba Higuera

- Author: Donna Barba Higuera
- Language: English
- Genre: Middle-grade fiction, Dystopian fiction, Science fiction
- Publisher: An Arthur A. Levine book published by Levine Querido
- Publication date: October 12, 2021
- Publication place: United States
- Media type: Hardcover
- Pages: 336
- Awards: Newbery Medal, Pura Belpre Award
- ISBN: 9781646140893

The Last Cuentista is a middle-grade dystopian novel by Donna Barba Higuera, published October 12, 2021, by Levine Querido. The story follows Petra Peña who, along with her family and a few hundred others, leave Earth to continue the human race after a comet strikes the planet. After awaking on a new planet, Petra is the only one who remembers Earth and must use storytelling to keep her people's history alive. It was published in British English under the title The Last Storyteller in 2022.

In 2022, the book won the Newbery Medal and Pura Belpré Award. The cover was illustrated by Raxenne Maniquiz.

== Plot ==
In 2061, twelve-year old Petra Peña, her seven-year-old brother Javier, and her mother and father prepare to leave a doomed Earth. They board the second of three colonization ships bound for the planet Sagan. The family will be placed in stasis for the 375-year voyage. During that time, useful skills will be downloaded to their brains through a "cog". Petra tries to delay when she discovers that her elective, mythology, has been mysteriously omitted from her courses. With rioters outside threatening the ship, Petra's parents convince her to relent. As the second ship takes off, rioters overrun the third ship, and it is unable to depart.

Petra's cog malfunctions, leaving her conscious but immobile. For the next few days, she listens to Ben, whose job is to monitor her and the other children in stasis. On Petra's thirteenth birthday, Ben downloads books into her mind. Shortly afterward, her cog puts her to sleep.

Petra wakes to the sound of a siege. A crowd outside the stasis room breaks in and murders Ben. A woman commands that Petra's electives, and all other knowledge from Earth, be erased.

Hundreds of years later, Petra is taken out of stasis by the Collective, a totalitarian movement that has seized control of the ship. When another girl, Suma Agarwal, asks for her mother, she is returned to stasis for reprogramming. Petra, whose malfunctioning cog has failed to erase her memories, tricks the Collective into believing she has been reprogrammed.

Petra, Suma, and a boy and girl whom she names Rubio and Feathers, have been woken to aid the colonization of Sagan. Petra searches for her family's stasis pods and learns that her mother and father were "purged" hundreds of years ago. Petra secretly tells Suma, Rubio, and Feathers a cuento, a traditional folk tale. Chancellor Nyla, who leads the Collective, orders the children and a Collective member named Len to take a shuttle to the planet. On Sagan, Petra collects samples of an extraordinarily poisonous plant. Simultaneously, Len vomits and breaks out in blisters, apparent side effects of genetic modifications made by the Collective to their members.

Petra tells Suma, Rubio, and Feathers another cuento. She meets a reprogrammed old man, Epsilon-5, who works in the ship's laboratory. Nyla orders Petra to create a defoliant that will remove some of Sagan's thick jungle. A boy named Voxy, who is one of the Collective but has secretly listened to Petra's cuentos, shows Petra a hidden room containing relics from Earth. Petra retrieves an obsidian pendant left to her by her grandmother Lita.

Epsilon-5 tells Petra that Nyla has had him turn the deadly plant into an airborne toxin, and Petra realizes that Nyla plans to kill the first ship's colonists. Petra recognizes a birthmark on Epsilon-5's hand and realizes he is Javier, her younger brother, who had been removed from stasis at least 70 years earlier than her. She attempts to neutralize the toxin. Len dies from his exposure to Sagan, so Nyla orders the Collective to prepare to depart for another planet. Petra retrieves Javier's old picture book and Suma's belongings from the relic room. When she reads Javier his book, he remembers her. He promises to fetch the other children but returns with Nyla.

Nyla puts Petra back into stasis for reprogramming. Javier removes Petra from stasis and apologizes, saying he met Nyla by chance. He has already brought the other children to the shuttle. He launches the shuttle but stays behind to blow up the dock.

When the shuttle arrives on Sagan, Petra learns that Voxy has stowed away with them. He says he no longer wants to be part of the Collective. Petra, Suma, Rubio, Feathers, and Voxy set out for the colony. Suma, who is still loyal to the Collective, begins to rebel at Petra's orders. Petra shows Suma her baby book and purple unicorn sweatshirt, and Suma remembers her old life. As the group approaches the settlement, a swarm of drones from the ship arrive and spray toxin. Petra despairs, believing that she failed to neutralize the toxin and that the first ship's colonists are now dead. The Collective's ship leaves Sagan. In the distance, from the settlement, Petra hears guitars and fiddles.

== Reception ==
The Last Cuentista generally received positive reviews, including starred reviews from Kirkus Reviews, Publishers Weekly, School Library Journal, and Shelf Awareness.

Kirkus called the book "[a]n exquisite tonic for storytellers far and wide, young and old." School Library Journal's Mara Alpert called it "[a] keep-you-up-all-night, compulsively readable science fiction novel that offers much food for thought." Writing for The Wall Street Journal, Megan Cox Gurden said it was "clever and compelling."

Previous Newbery winner Tae Keller said The Last Cuentista

“certainly veers into the dark end of middle-grade fiction, with brainwashing, ‘purging’, and, yes, the destruction of our entire planet ... but it doesn’t dwell in the darkness, preferring to give its readers healthy doses of hope, wonder and page-turning action.”

The Last Cuentista was named one of the best children's books of the year by BookPage, The Boston Globe, the Chicago Public Library, Kirkus, the New York Public Library, Publishers Weekly, School Library Journal, TIME, and The Wall Street Journal.

Awards and honors for The Last Cuentista
Year	Award/Honor	Result	Ref.
2021	Cybils Award	Finalist	
2022	Newbery Medal	Winner	
2022	Pura Belpré Award for Author	Winner	

Awards
Preceded by When You Trap a Tiger	Newbery Medal recipient 2022	Succeeded by Freewater
