= Flenniken =

Flenniken is a surname. Notable people with this surname include:

- Kathleen Flenniken (born 1960), American writer, poet, editor, and educator
- Mack Flenniken (1905–1956), American American football player and coach
- Brian Flenniken, member of Mad Caddies
- Shary Flenniken (born 1950), American illustrator
