= Guarnaschelli =

Guarnaschelli is an Italian surname. Notable people with the surname include:

- Alex Guarnaschelli (born 1969), American chef, daughter of Maria
- Maria Guarnaschelli (1941–2021), American cookbook editor and publisher
