= Lupe Wong Won't Dance =

2020 middle-grade novel by Donna Barba Higuera

- Author: Donna Barba Higuera
- Language: English, Spanish
- Genre: Middle-grade fiction
- Publisher: Levine Querido, Arthur A. Levine
- Publication date: September 8, 2020
- Publication place: United States
- Media type: Hardcover, Paperback, Audiobook
- Pages: 272
- Awards: Pura Belpre Award honor
- ISBN: 9781646140039 Hardcover edition
- OCLC: 1135582547

Lupe Wong Won't Dance, also published as Lupe Wong No Baila, is a middle-grade sports novel written by Donna Barba Higuera. The book was illustrated by Mason London, translated to Spanish by Libia Brenda, and published on September 8, 2020 by Levine Querido. It is a Junior Library Guild selection, a Pura Belpré Award honor book, and PNBA Book Award winner.

== Plot ==
Guadalupe "Lupe" Wong is a half-Chinese, half-Mexican seventh grade student at Issaquah Middle School and she dreams of becoming the first female pitcher in Major League Baseball. An opportunity arises for her to meet Fu Li Hernandez, “the first Asian/Latino pitcher in the major leagues,” if she receives straight A's in her classes. Everything goes well until she learns that she will have to square dance in gym class to earn an A.

== Reception ==
Lupe Wong Won't Dance is a Junior Library Guild book. It received many positive reviews, including starred reviews from Booklist and Publishers Weekly.

Kirkus Reviews applauded the book's diversity in terms of character's interests and ethnicities and how Higuera was able to avoid "'diversity quota' pitfalls."

Selenia Paz, writing for Booklist, called Lupe Wong Won't Dance "[a] laugh-out-loud story about family, friendship, and the beauty in being true to yourself."

Awards and honors for Lupe Wong Won't Dance
Year	Award/Honor	Result	Ref.
2020	ALSC Notable Children's Books	Selection	
2020	Booklist Editors' Choice: Books for Youth	Selection	
2021	Booklist's Best Middle-Grade Debuts	Top 10	
2021	Booklist's Best Sports Books for Youth	Top 10	
2021	PNBA Book Award	Winner	
2021	Pura Belpré Award for Author	Honor	
2021	Sid Fleischman Humor Award	Winner	
