= Nora Okja Keller =

Korean American author (born 1966)

- Born: December 22, 1966; Seoul, South Korea
- Occupation: Novelist
- Spouse: James Keller
- Writing career
- Notable works: Comfort Woman, Fox Girl
- Notable awards: American Book Award; Elliot Cades Award for Literature; Pushcart Prize

Nora Okja Keller (born 22 December 1966, in Seoul, South Korea) is a Korean-American author. Her 1997 breakthrough work of fiction, Comfort Woman, and her second book (2002), Fox Girl, focus on multigenerational trauma resulting from Korean women's experiences as sex slaves, euphemistically called comfort women, for Japanese and American troops during World War II and the ongoing Korean War.

== Critical acclaim ==
Keller's first novel was highly praised by critics, including Michiko Kakutani in The New York Times, who said that in Comfort Woman, "Keller has written a powerful book about mothers and daughters and the passions that bind generations." Kakutani called it "a lyrical and haunting novel" and "an impressive debut." Comfort Woman won the American Book Award in 1998 and the 1999 Elliot Cades Award; previously, in 1995, Keller won the Pushcart Prize for a short story, "Mother-Tongue", which became the second chapter of Comfort Woman. In 2003, she won the Hawai'i Award for Literature.

== Professional background ==
Keller is a graduate of the Punahou School in Honolulu. She received her B.A. from the University of Hawaiʻi at Mānoa with a double major in psychology and English and worked in Honolulu as a freelance writer, including at the newspaper Honolulu Star-Bulletin. She earned an M.A. and a Ph.D. in American Literature from the University of California, Santa Cruz. She now works as an English teacher at Punahou School.

== Personal background and ethnicity ==
Keller was raised primarily by her Korean mother, Tae Im Beane, in Hawaii and identifies her ethnicity as Korean American. Her father, Robert Cobb, however, was a German computer engineer. She has lived in Hawaii from the age of three. Married since 1990 to James Keller, she has two daughters, Tae and Sunhi Keller. Her daughter, Tae Keller, received the 2021 Newbery Medal from the American Library Association for her young adult book When You Trap a Tiger.

== Influences on her work ==
Keller says she first heard of the term "Asian American" when she took a course in Asian American literature, the first course in this topic offered by the University of Hawaii. The syllabus included Maxine Hong Kingston, Jade Snow Wong, and Joy Kogawa. The genesis of Comfort Woman dated to a 1993-human rights symposium at the University of Hawaii where Keller heard a presentation by Keum Ja Hwang, who had been a comfort woman. "Her experience was so extraordinary," Keller has said, "I thought someone should write about it." Keller's novels explore her own complex ethnic identity in the context of Hawaii's multi-ethnic society and her relationship with her mother (upon whom "some details" of characters in her fiction are based).

== Other writing ==
- Fox Girl
- Yobo : Korean American Writing in Hawai'i, edited by Keller, Honolulu, HI : Bamboo Ridge Press, 2003
- Intersecting Circles: The Voices of Hapa Women in Poetry and Prose, edited by Keller & Marie Hara, Bamboo Ridge Press, 1999
- Comfort Woman
