= Tablet (confectionery) =

Sugary confection from Scotland

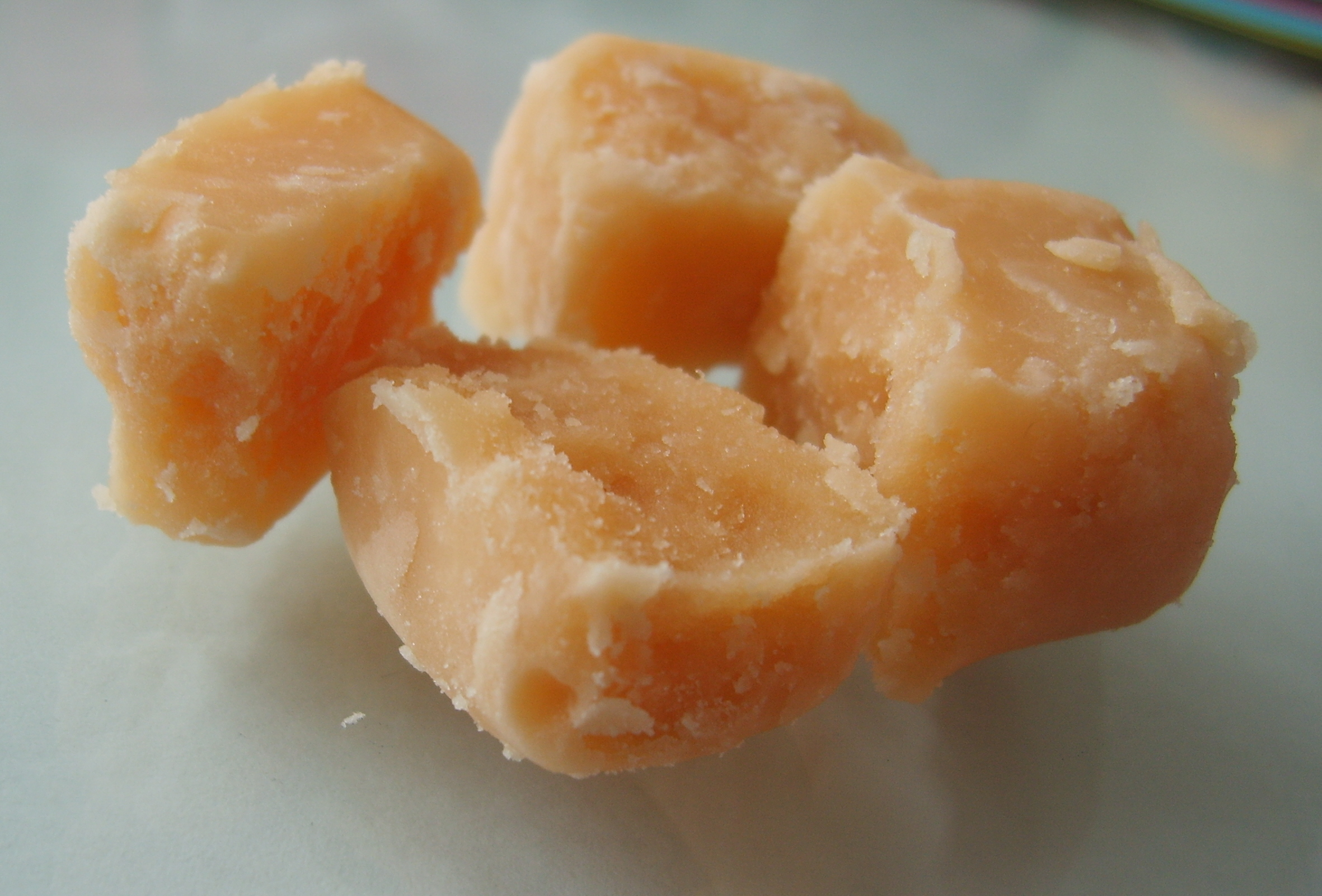
- Type: Confectionery
- Place of origin: Scotland
- Main ingredients: Butter, sugar, condensed milk

Tablet (taiblet in Scots) is a medium-hard, sugary confection from Scotland. Tablet is usually made from sugar, condensed milk, and butter, which is boiled to a soft-ball stage and allowed to crystallise. It is often flavoured with vanilla and sometimes has nut pieces in it.

Tablet differs from fudge in that it has a brittle, grainy texture, where fudge is much softer. Well-made tablet is a medium-hard confection, not as soft as fudge, but not as hard as boiled sweets.

Commercially available tablet often uses fondant instead of the milk products. This produces a slightly less granular texture compared to the traditional home-made tablet, and is supposedly easier to prepare on a commercial scale.

== History ==
According to The Scots Kitchen by F. Marian McNeill, tablet is noted in The Household Book of Lady Grisell Baillie in the early 18th century. The traditional recipe uses just sugar and cream. More modern recipes substitute condensed milk and butter for the cream, as cream has a tendency to burn when boiled.

== Names ==
Tablet is sometimes referred to as Swiss Milk tablet (Swiss Milk being a term used by some for condensed milk) or butter tablet.

== See also ==
- Barfi
- Caramel
- Dulce de leche
- Penuche
- Sucre à la crème
