= Sucre à la crème =

Canadian confectionery

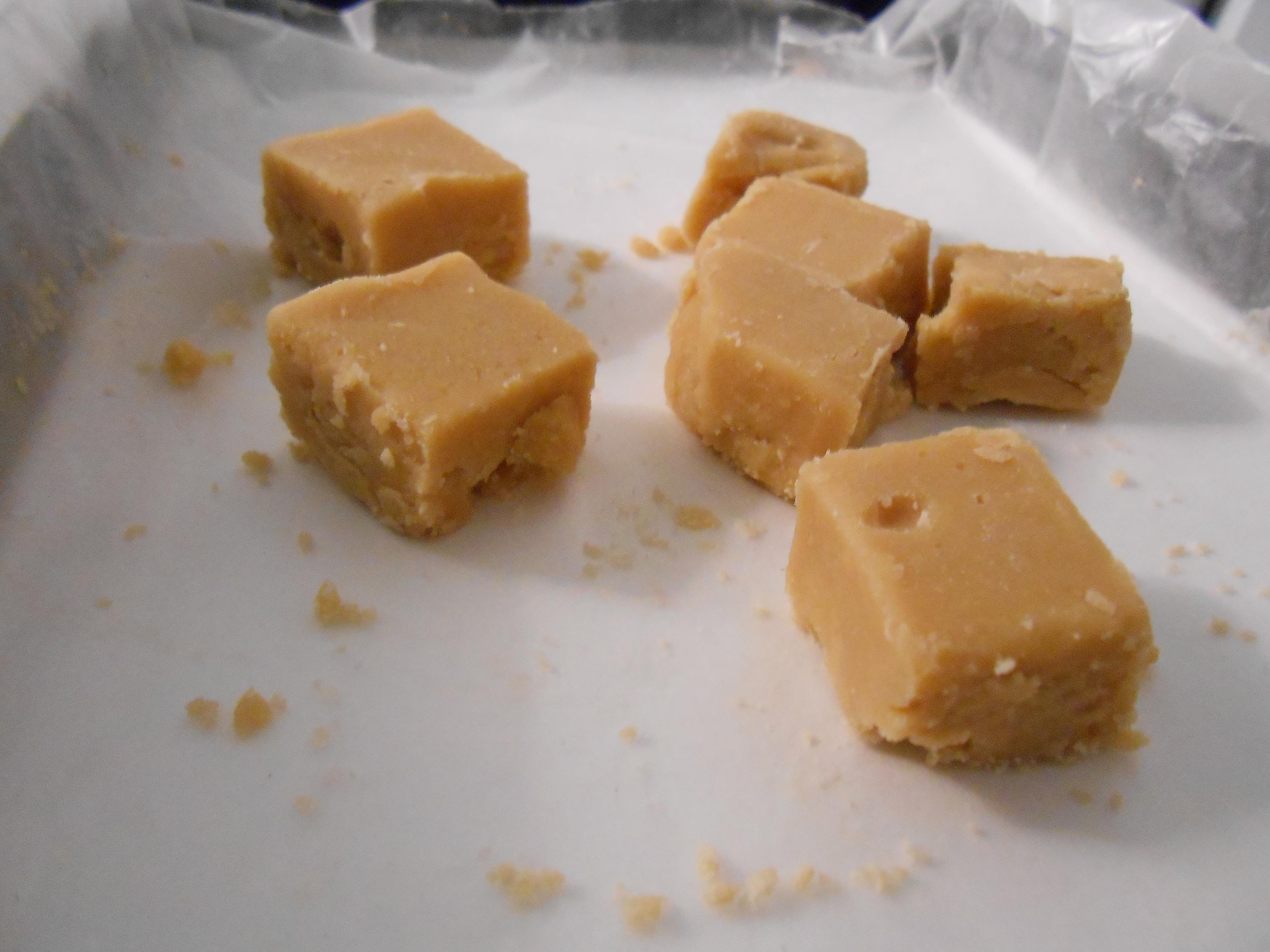
- Type: Candy (Tablet)
- Course: Dessert
- Place of origin: Quebec
- Serving temperature: Room Temperature
- Main ingredients: Cream, Sugar, Brown Sugar

Sucre à la crème (or Maple Fudge) is a confectionery popular in and originating from French Canada. It was originally made with cream and maple sugar, but nowadays the latter is commonly replaced by a mixture of sugar and brown sugar. In all cases, the mixture is cooked, cooled and then kneaded. Depending on the fineness of the crystals obtained, it can be granular or very soft. The texture is firm enough to cut and hold. Sucre à la crème is usually served as small cubes.

Other ingredients are sometimes added, like butter, maple syrup, walnuts, pecans, vanilla, or chocolate.

This delicacy is especially popular during the Holiday season. But, it is also a common sight in grocery stores and convenience stores.

It bears many similarities to Scottish tablets and American fudge.

== Recipe links ==
- Sucre à la crème in the Microwave
- 3 Ingredient Sucre à la crème
- Sucre à la crème of Soeur Angèle
