= Serious Eats =

Food enthusiast website and blog

- Website type: Blog
- Available in: English
- Owner: People Inc.
- Creator: Ed Levine
- Website: www.seriouseats.com

Serious Eats is a website and blog focused on food enthusiasts, created by food critic and author Ed Levine. A Serious Eats book was published by Levine in 2011. Serious Eats was acquired by Fexy Media in 2015 and then by Dotdash in late 2020.

== Content ==
The site consists of general food features as well as recipes, home cooking advice, and equipment reviews.

The site is notable for launching the career of J. Kenji Lopez-Alt, whose column "The Food Lab" was adapted into a James Beard award-winning cookbook of the same name. Lopez-Alt's writing was highly regarded among amateur cooks for its rigorous approach to cooking and recreating cultural food icons, such as the ShackBurger and Chick-fil-a, in the home kitchen.

Other notable past contributors to the website include Stella Parks and Sohla El-Waylly.

== Critical reception ==
In 2008, Serious Eats was ranked #17 on Time magazine's list of the 50 Best Websites. Serious Eats was the recipient of two James Beard Foundation awards in 2010 for Best Food Blog and Best Video Webcast.

== See also ==
- List of websites about food and drink
- The Food Lab, a cookbook written by Serious Eats columnist J. Kenji López–Alt
