= Penuche =

Candy

- Type: Confectionery
- Place of origin: United States
- Main ingredients: Brown sugar, butter, milk; often nuts

Penuche (/pəˈnutʃi/) is a fudge-like candy made from brown sugar, butter, and milk, using no flavorings except for vanilla. Penuche often has a tannish color, and is lighter than regular fudge. It is formed by the caramelization of brown sugar; thus, its flavor is said to be reminiscent of caramel. Nuts, especially pecans, are often added to penuche for texture, frequently in the making of penuche candies. It is primarily a regional food, found in New England and some places in the Southern United States, though in the latter it goes by different names, including creamy praline fudge, and brown sugar fudge candy.

== Origins ==
Panocha is said to come from the Spanish word for 'raw sugar'. It was rumored to be slightly vulgar in nature in Portuguese as slang. It has also been proposed that penuche originates in Portugal and was made popular in New England among Portuguese whaling families in Essex, Connecticut, and New Bedford, Massachusetts, during the whaling stint of the mid to late 1700s through the end of commercial whaling. However, recent scholarship traces panocha (or panocha de leche) instead back to the 18th century sugar plantations in New Spain. Penuche is also used as a boiled icing flavor. In Hawaii, its name is localized as panocha or panuche. As an icing, it was common as a topping for prune cake.

== Method of preparation ==
Penuche is classed in the fudge family because it follows a similar method of preparation:

1. A fat-sugar solution is heated to the soft ball stage, about 236 °F (113 °C).
2. The solution is cooled without disturbance to tepid, about 110 °F (43 °C).
3. Flavorings are added and the solution is beaten until thick.
4. The mixture is poured into a pan, allowed to cool, and cut into bite-sized pieces.

Most traditional (i.e. not "no-cook" or "quick") fudges follow a similar preparation method. What distinguishes penuche is the use of brown sugar rather than white.

== Similar dishes ==
A very similar confection is sucre à la crème (cream sugar), a Québec confection traditionally prepared during the winter holiday season. The universality of the brown sugar and dairy confection manifests in the form of a slightly crumblier treat called Tablet originating in Scotland. Penuche frosting is a type of boiled frosting made from the same ingredients and with the same technique, but is spreadable.

== See also ==
- Fudge
