= Fudge =

Type of sugar candy

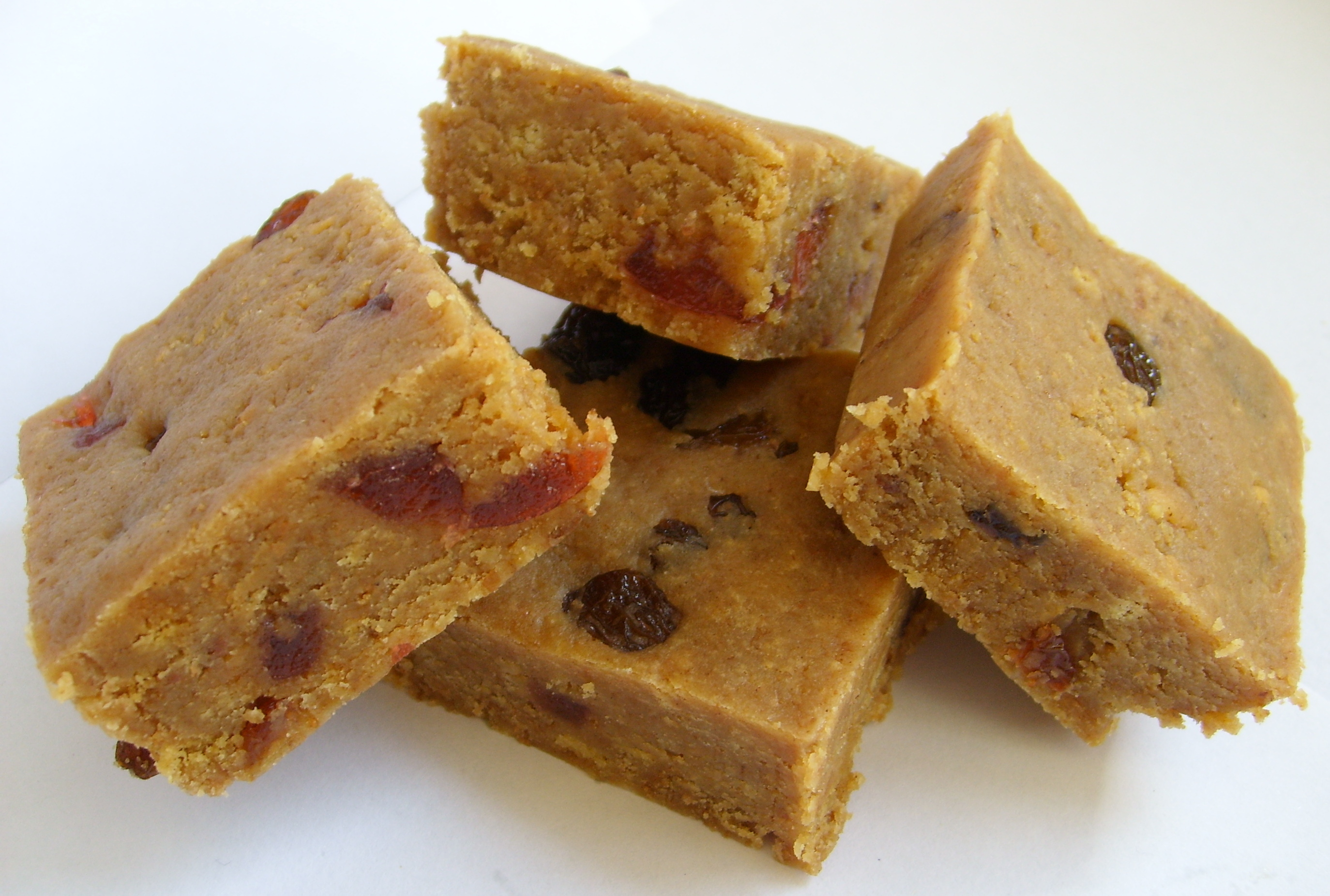
- Fruit fudge
- Type: Confectionery
- Place of origin: United States of America
- Serving temperature: Room temperature
- Main ingredients: Sugar, butter, milk

Fudge is a confection made by mixing sugar, butter, and milk. Modern fudge has its origins in the 19th century United States, and became popular in American women's colleges late in the century. Fudge can come in a variety of flavorings depending on the region or country it was made; popular flavors include fruit, nut, chocolate, and caramel. Fudge is often bought as a gift from a gift shop in tourist areas and attractions.

== History ==
In the Oxford Dictionary of Word Origins, the term fudge, used as an expression of annoyance, is traced to the 18th century. This use is described as likely stemming from the earlier "fadge", meaning "to fit".

The creation of fudge in America is typically characterized as accidental, coming about as a cook attempted to make a different confection. Food writer Lee Edwards Benning, drawing on her experimentation with fudge describes the creation as most likely the outcome of "taking the ingredients for caramel and handling them as if making a fondant". Within Britain, various communities in the Midlands and Cornwall had been making local variations of the Scottish sweet, tablet, for centuries which would retroactively be referred to as fudge by the 1890s. Cornish fudge in particular traces its origins to the 18th century, when Cornish confectioners started using clotted cream instead of milk to make their traditional version of tablet.

"Chocolate caramels"—confections made by boiling milk, brown sugar, chocolate, and butter—were popular in the United States during the 1860s and 1870s. These had ingredient ratios and technique close to the modern fudge, and are characterised as a type of fudge by food writer Stella Parks. One of these recipes cited by Parks was published in 1874 in the American agricultural magazine The Cultivator and Country Gentleman, crediting a "Baltimore friend" for "Caramel":

Six ounces of Baker's chocolate; 1 ½ lbs. of brown sugar; ½ lb. butter; 1 cup of milk or cream. Boil 20 minutes; after it begins to boil stirring all the time; pour in pie plates. This quantity makes four plates. (Note: In metric: 170g of Baker's chocolate; 680g of brown sugar; 227g of butter; 1 cup of milk or cream.)

— The Cultivator and Country Gentleman, Vol. 39

Unlike modern fudge, this fudge was stirred consistently, producing a crumbly texture as the syrup crystallized. Another similar recipe appeared in The Cultivator and Country Gentleman at the end of the decade, again drawing an association with Baltimore. When this confection began to be called fudge is difficult to identify, given the widespread use of 'fudge' in the colloquial sense during the 19th century. By the 1880s and 1890s, mentions of and recipes for fudge appeared widely in American periodicals and advertisements, arriving as prices for sugar and chocolate became increasingly cheap. This early fudge was cut into squares and diamonds and was marketed as a chaste, wholesome treat, contrasting with perceptions of contemporary confections such as luxury bonbons and penny candy. Other than chocolate, early fudge were often flavored with butterscotch, coconut, maple sugar, and vanilla.

The process by which fudge went from crumbly to smooth confection is likewise not firmly known, though Parks posits that the transition can be explained as a consequence of "sheer neglect", as fudge was left to cook over lower temperatures without stirring and the sugar crystals did not crystallize.

=== Fudge at women's colleges ===
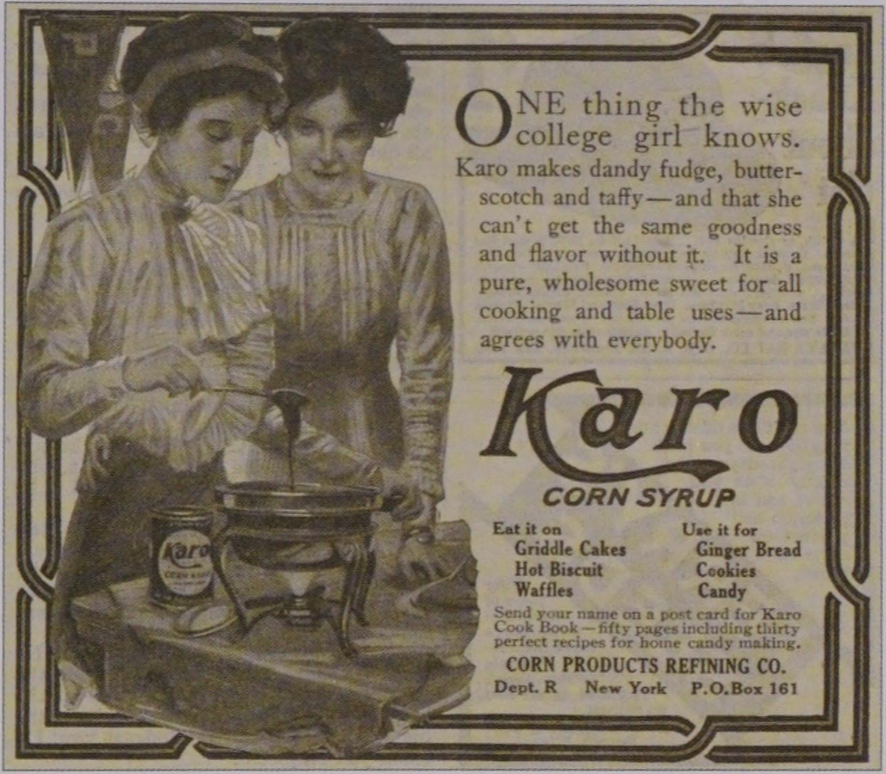
"College girls" making fudge in a 1910 advertisement for corn syrup

Making fudge was a popular activity at women's colleges, especially Vassar College in Poughkeepsie, New York. In a letter written by Emelyn Battersby Hartridge, a student at Vassar College, she recounts the purchase of a box of fudge, which was sold for 40 cents a pound in 1886 in Baltimore, Maryland. She also claimed to have given fudge its "real introduction" to Vassar College in 1888 by selling her own 30 lb (14 kg) batch. The diary of student Elma Martin mentions making "fudges" in 1892. An 1893 letter from a Vassar College student Adelaide Mansfield describes "fudges" as containing sugar, fruit, chocolate, milk, and butter.

A recipe for "Fudges at Vassar" was printed in The Sun in 1894. Despite describing the confections as "Vassar chocolates", the recipe given comprises sugar, milk, butter, and vanilla extract. Wellesley College and Smith College have their own versions of a fudge recipe dating from the late 19th or early 20th century.

The popularity of fudge on women's college campuses was expressed in an 1895 song by Vassar students:

We love the sight of the fudge-pan bright,
We love the sight of the spoon,
And better by far than the light of the star
Is the gas, now outshining the moon.
Then gather around with whispers profound
For the bell has rung ten at night,
With the transom shut, at our very last cut
We'll sing to the fudge-pan bright...

— Vassar Miscellany 24, no. 8 [May 1895]

By the 1920s fudge was being eaten in the United Kingdom under its American name and as "tablets", as evidenced by its appearance in the 1920 edition of Harmsworth's Universal Encyclopaedia, which described fudge as "a sweetmeat that hails from America, but is now popular in other countries also. [It is] made from white or brown sugar, milk, cream, or condensed milk, butter and flavored with chocolate, coffee, and vanilla essence. Margarine can be used instead of butter, but the toffee does not set so well nor is the taste quite so rich or good".

== Ingredients ==
A basic fudge preparation includes milk, butter, and sugar. Various substitutes for these ingredients exist: milk may be substituted for heavy or light cream or various plant milks, sugar may be brown or white, and butter may be substituted for margarine. Even when butter is being used it may be salted or unsalted, although the salted variety is more popular as it makes ingredients boil in a more stable fashion.

Marshmallow, inverted sugar syrup, corn syrup, or fondant are sometimes added to produce a more smooth fudge.

== Production ==
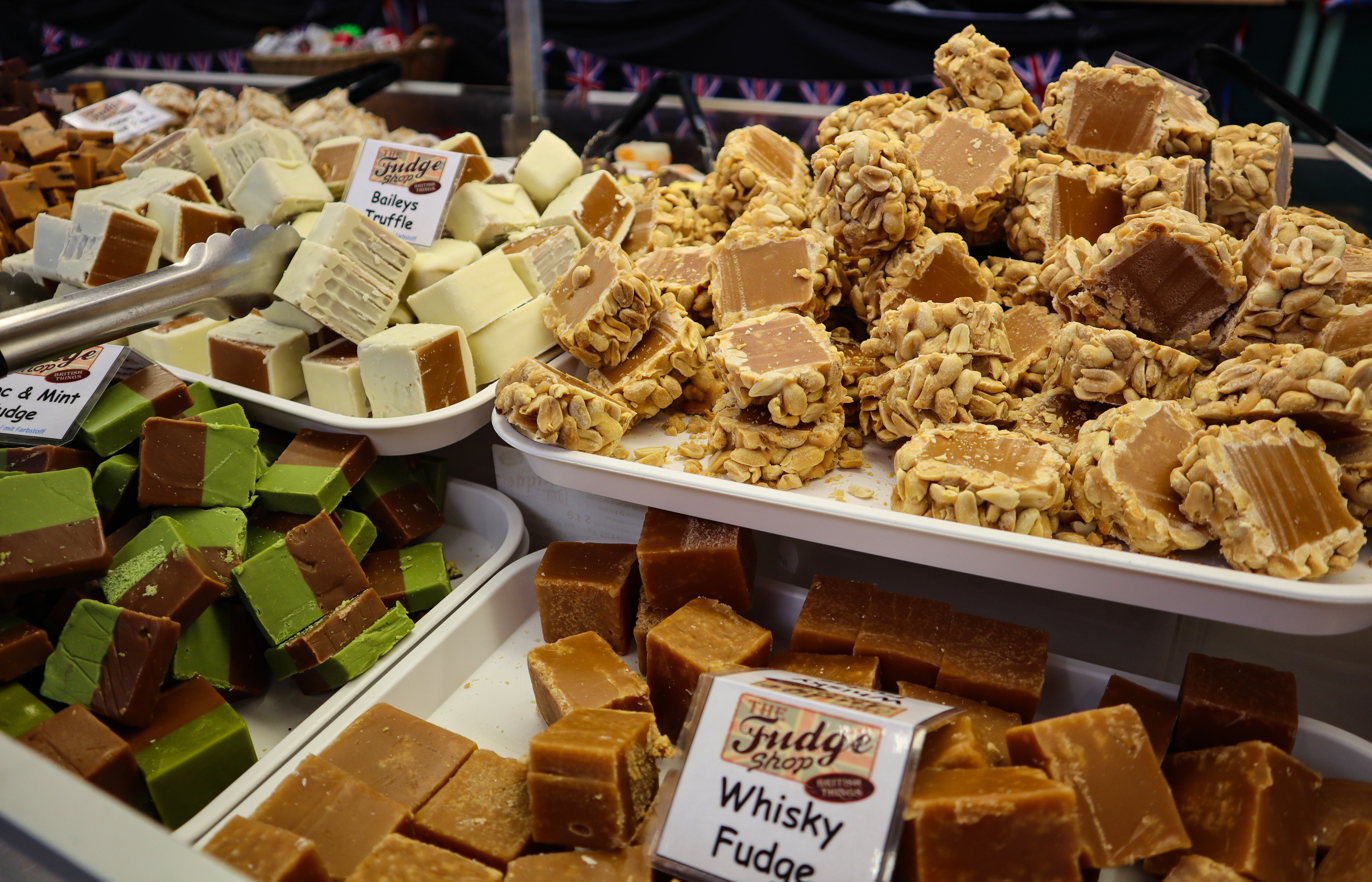
Assorted fudges

In the classic method, fudge is made by heating milk and sugar to the soft-ball stage, adding butter, then cooling to 118–120 °F (48–49 °C). The mixture is beaten until "thick, creamy, and less glossy".

When made at home fudge can be made either in a saucepan on a stovetop or in the microwave. If made in the microwave it takes about 10 minutes which is quicker than on the stove, and must be stirred every 2 minutes.

=== Heating and mixing ===
Fudge made in the classic method begins by adding milk and sugar to a pot. In most cookbooks, this pot is tall and heavy, although Benning argues a wider pot with greater surface area permits faster evaporation and less vigorous stirring. As the ingredients warm up, they are gently stirred, preventing burning at the bottom of the pot. When hot enough, the sugar begins to dissolve, forming a supersaturated solution. At the same time, crystals begin to precipitate out onto the sides of the pot above the liquid. To prevent this, cookbooks recommend methods including buttering the sides of the pot, or brushing the crystals with a pastry brush dipped in water, dissolving crystals back into the solution.

The temperature these ingredients are heated to determines the resulting texture: too hot and the fudge will be dry, below 240 °F (116 °C) and the fudge will not set as it typically would. No exact temperature for these points can be given, as outcomes are ultimately dependent on factors dependent on each kitchen including humidity, altitude, and temperature. (Note: As an example of the variability in fudge production, Benning describes an occasion where a different fudge was produced after running the dishwasher and the room's humidity was altered.) On a cooler day for instance, fudge typically reaches the soft-ball stage around 2 °F cooler than usual, or 1 °C. Sources disagree on what the soft-ball stage involves. Various sources quote temperature ranges between 234–245 °F (112–118 °C), and describe confectionery boiled to soft-ball stage being dipped in water and coming out able to be flattened, or unable to be flattened.

Mixing is done by hand; an electric beater would go too fast for the cook to control the process. Parks suggests a smoother product can be acquired by kneading rather than stirring.

=== Cooling ===
While still molten, fudge is left on a cool slab until it is around 118–120 °F (48–49 °C). As the fudge cools, sugars begins to crystallize, giving the final fudge a smoother consistency. Some manufacturers encourage crystallization by adding ingredients such as marshmallow, inverted sugar syrup, corn syrup, or fondant. If the slab is above a certain temperature, corn syrup crystallizes around the fudge to form a sugar crust that cracks in the mouth. This is considered a production defect by some manufacturers, although some consumers prefer this crispy exterior.

By the late 20th century, manufacturers employed various instruments to heat and cool slabs to the desired temperature, including electric blankets in the winter and large pieces of ice in the summer. When fudge is produced is also relevant: as successive batches are cooled on the slab, the surface is heated, meaning earlier batches are cooked to higher temperatures to ready them for a cooler slab. Slab temperature is only one of several variables accounted for in industrial production, among atmospheric pressure, humidity, and room temperature. In the case of atmospheric pressure, manufacturers heat fudge to lower temperatures, to allow for the lower boiling point of water.

== Characteristics ==
Brown sugar gives fudge an acidic flavor. Fudge is softer than caramel and more firm than fondant.

== Varieties ==
Fudge-making has evolved a variety of flavors and additives. Flavors vary by location: in the United States, chocolate is a default flavor, with peanut butter and maple as alternatives. When it is made from brown sugar, it is called penuche and is typically found in New England and the Southern States.

In the UK, rum-and-raisin, clotted cream and salted-caramel are popular flavours. Fudge shares similarities with tablet, a confection with similar ingredients but a grainy, brittle texture.

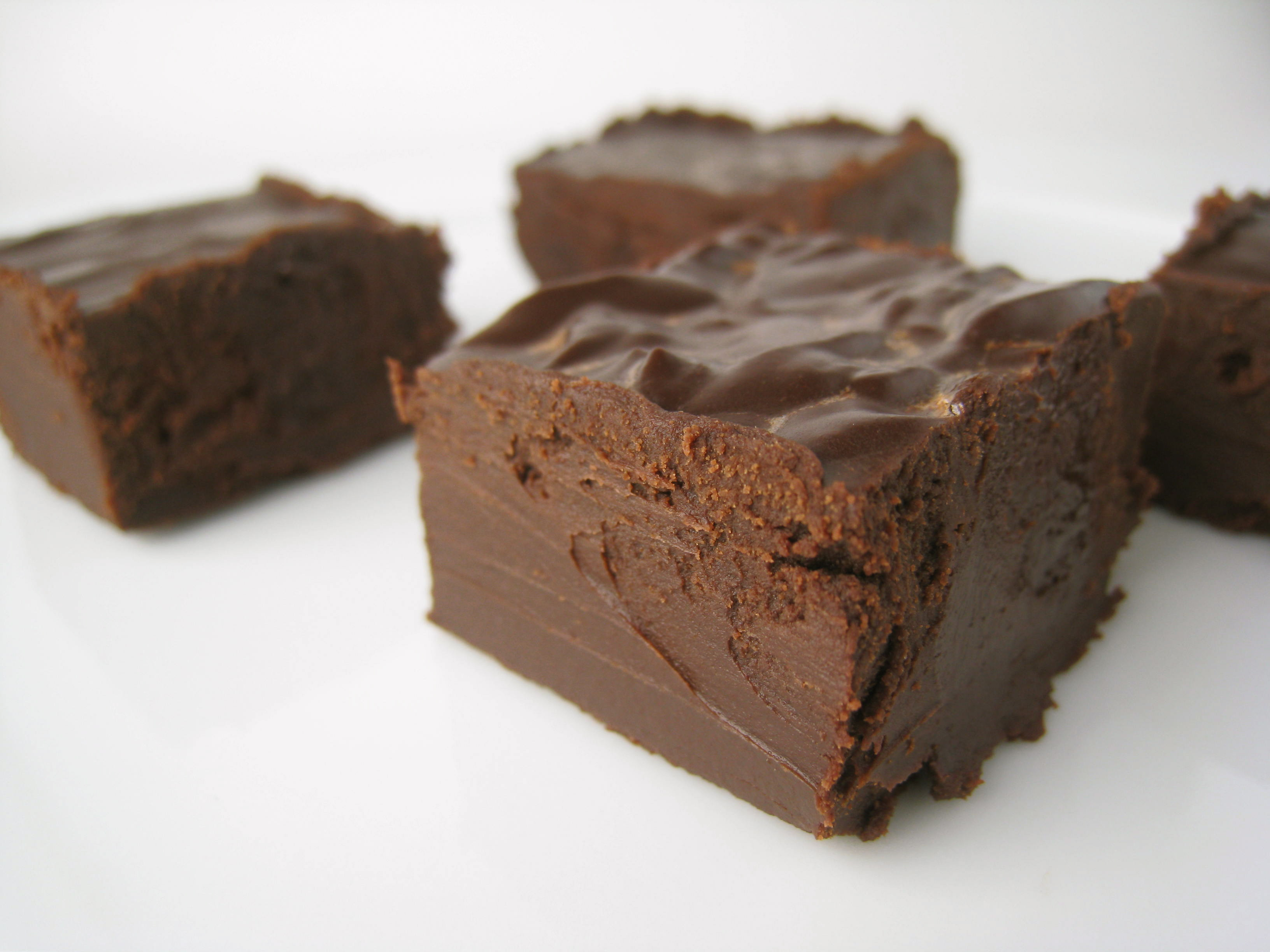
Chocolate

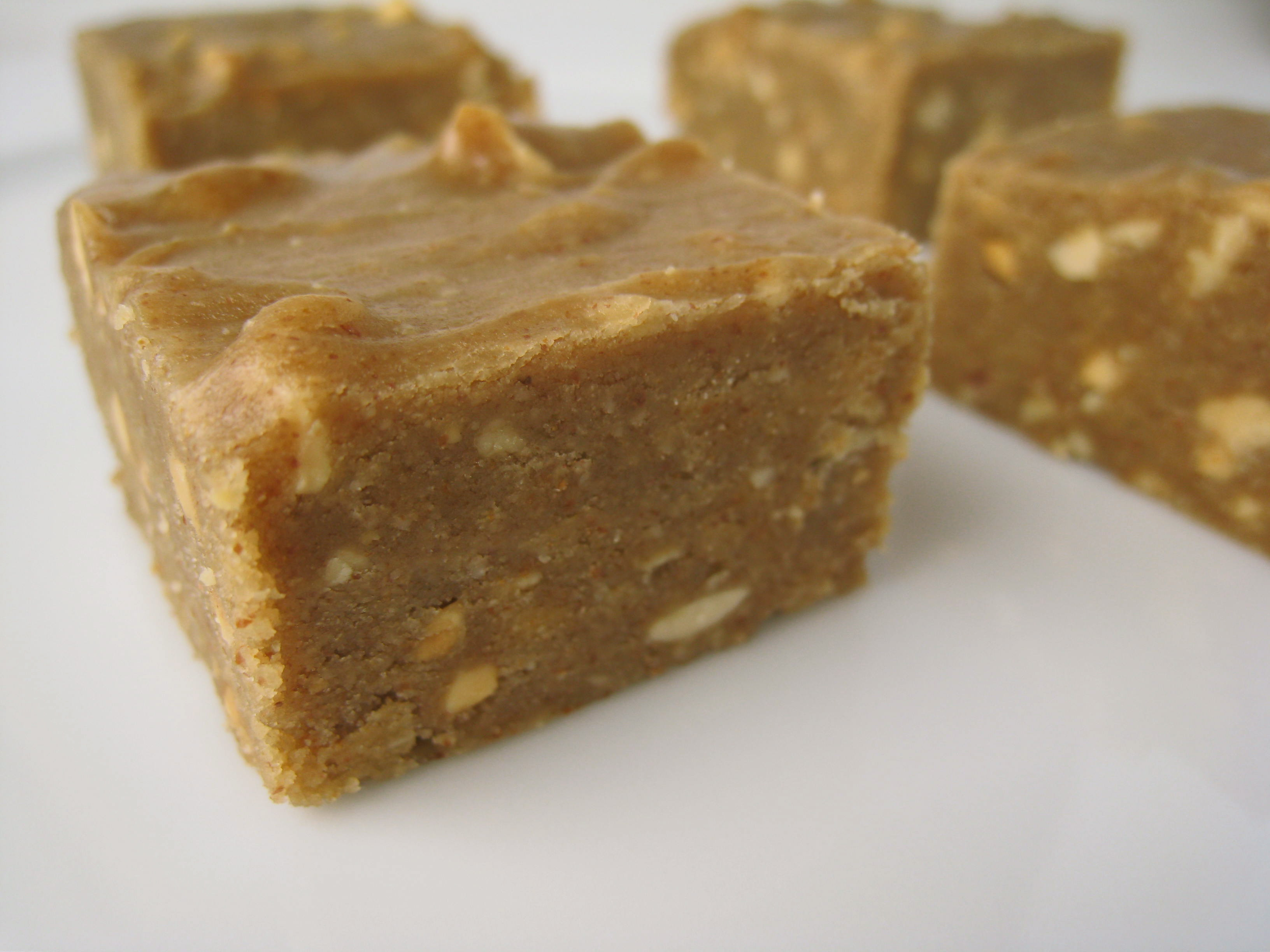
Peanut butter maple

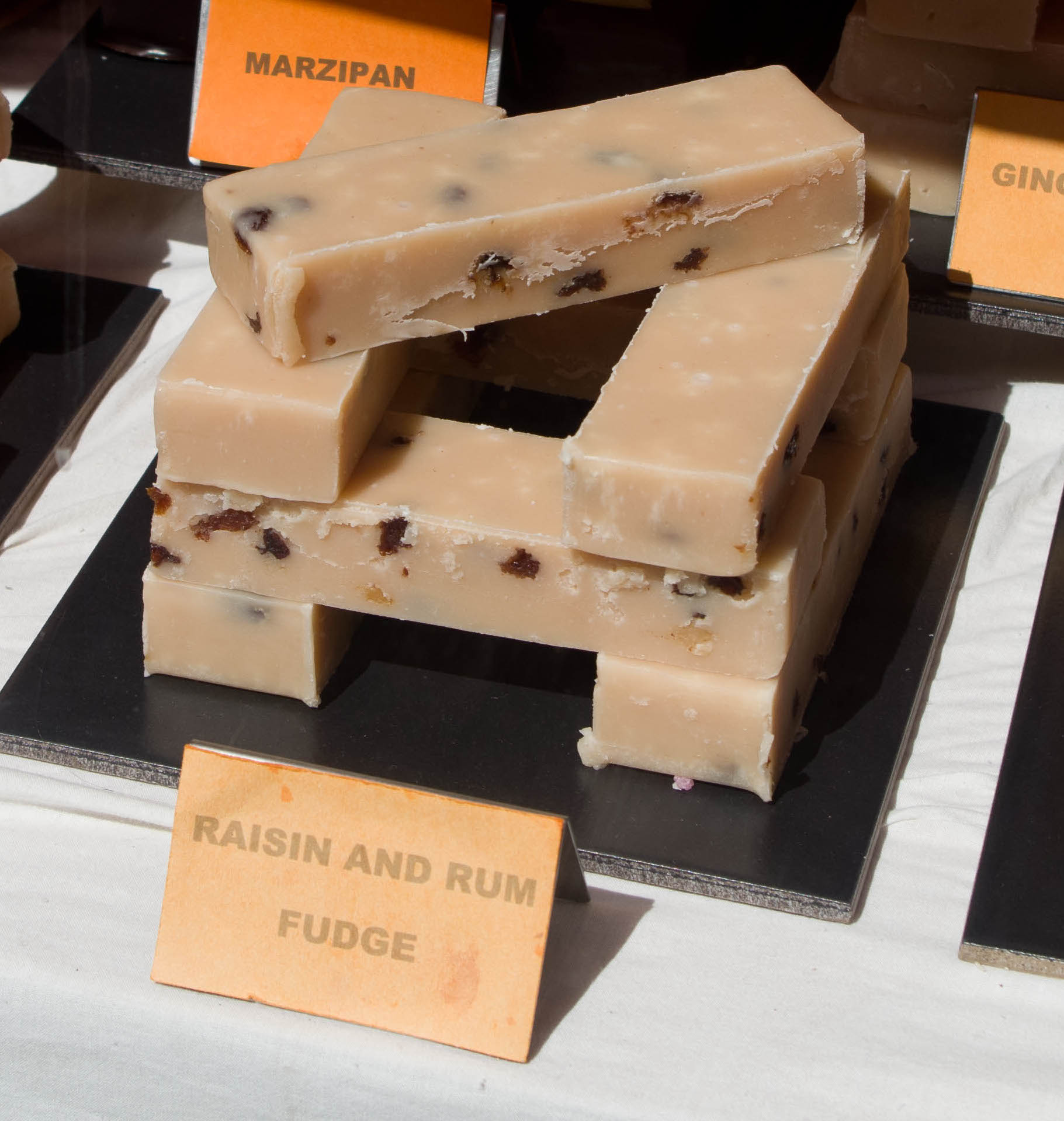
Rum raisin

== Hot fudge ==
Hot fudge sauce is a chocolate product often used in the United States and Canada as a topping for ice cream in a heated form, particularly sundaes, parfaits and occasionally s'mores. The butter in typical fudge is replaced with heavy cream, resulting in a thick chocolate sauce that is pourable while hot and becomes denser as the sauce cools. Commercial hot fudge sauce syrups (flavored with either natural or artificial flavorings) are generally thinner and formulated to be usable at room temperature.

== See also ==
- Barfi – a South Asian mithai made by cooking milk and sugar into the consistency of fudge
- Condensed milk – Milk from which water has been removed and sugar added
- Fudge cookie
- Krówki – Polish confection similar to fudge
- Penuche – a fudge-like confection made with brown sugar, butter and milk
- Praline (nut confection) – Confection made with nuts
- Tablet (confectionery) a Scottish confectionery
- Toffee – Confection made by caramelizing sugar or molasses along with butter and flour

== Sources ==
=== Primary ===
- Baltimore Friend (1874). "Candy Making". The Cultivator & Country Gentleman. Vol. 39.

=== Secondary ===
- Benning, Lee Edwards (1993) [1990]. Oh Fudge!: A Celebration of America's Favorite Candy. New York: Owl Books. ISBN 0-8050-2546-4.
- Cresswell, Julia (2021). Oxford Dictionary of Word Origins (3rd ed.). Oxford University Press. ISBN 978-0-191-90520-9.
- Stavely, Keith; Fitzgerald, Kathleen (2015). "Fudge". In Goldstein, Darra (ed.). The Oxford Companion to Sugar and Sweets. Oxford: Oxford University Press. ISBN 978-0-199-31339-6.
- Jones, Charlotte Foltz (1991). Mistakes That Worked. Doubleday. ISBN 0-385-26246-9.
- Parks, Stella (2017). BraveTart: Iconic American Desserts. New York & London: W.W. Norton & Company. ISBN 978-0-393-23986-7.
