= J. Kenji López-Alt =

American chef and food writer (born 1979)

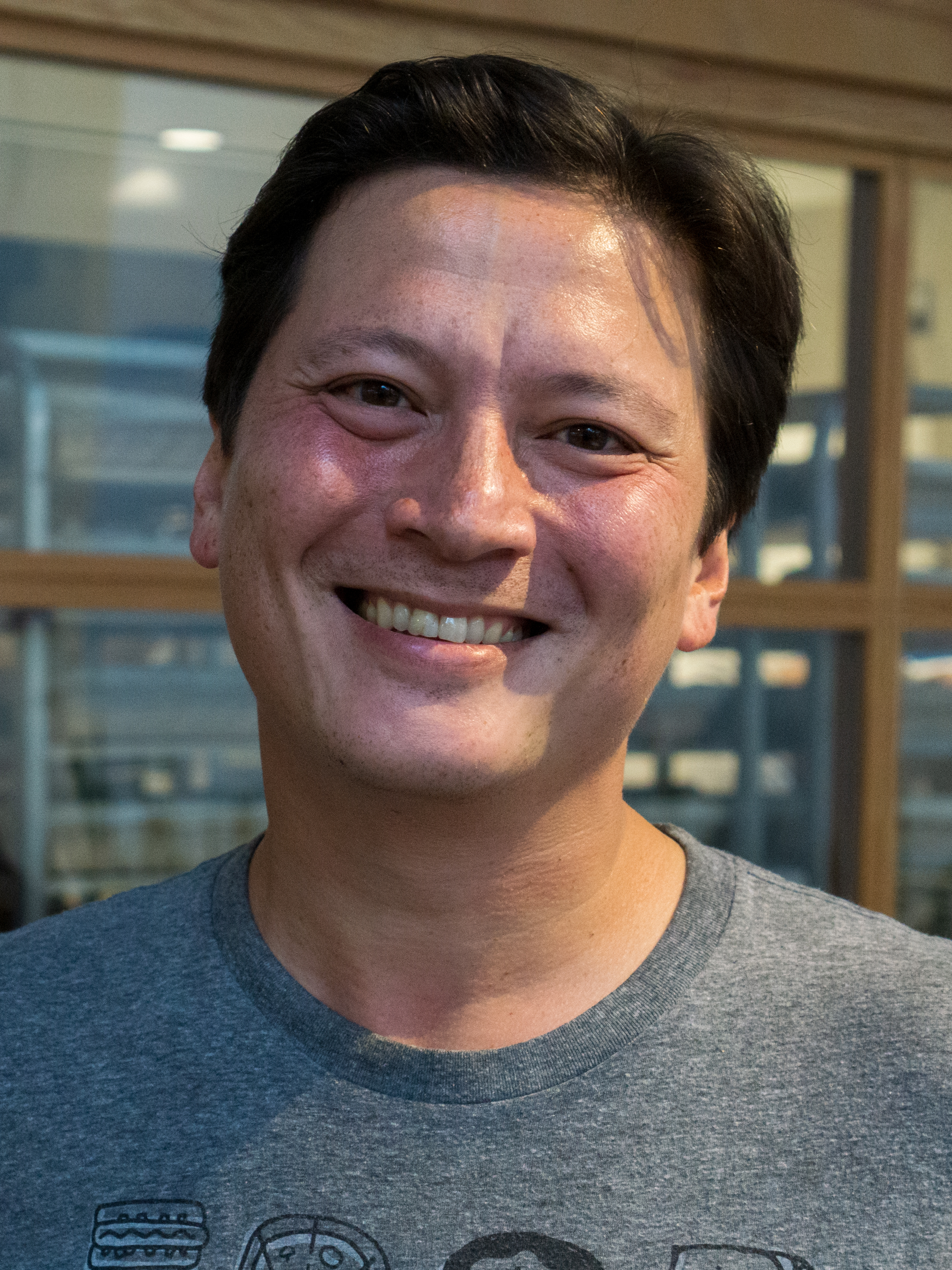
- López-Alt in 2019
- Born: James Kenji Alt; October 31, 1979 (age 47); Boston, Massachusetts, U.S.
- Education: Massachusetts Institute of Technology
- Spouse: Adriana López-Alt (m. 2009–2025)
- Children: 2
- Culinary career
- Awards
- James Beard Award, General Cooking (2016); IACP Cookbook of the Year (2016); James Beard Award, Single Subject (2023)

YouTube information
- Channel: J. Kenji López-Alt
- Years active: 2016–present
- Genres: Cooking; education
- Subscribers: 1.76 million
- Views: 294.5 million
- Last updated: August 4, 2026
- Website: kenjilopezalt.com

James Kenji López-Alt (né Alt; born October 31, 1979) is an American chef and food writer. His first book, The Food Lab: Better Home Cooking Through Science, became a critical and commercial success, charting on the New York Times Bestseller list and winning the 2016 James Beard Foundation Award for the best General Cooking cookbook. The cookbook expanded on López-Alt's "The Food Lab" column on the Serious Eats blog. López-Alt is known for using the scientific method in his cooking to improve popular American recipes and to explain the science of cooking.

López-Alt co-founded Wursthall in 2017, a beer hall style restaurant in San Mateo, California where he stayed on until 2022. He now maintains a YouTube channel in which he demonstrates various recipes and cooking techniques with a POV filming style. He released a children's book titled Every Night is Pizza Night in 2020 and a cookbook titled The Wok: Recipes and Techniques in 2022 which focused on the eponymous cooking vessel. Both books became New York Times Bestsellers, with the latter earning López-Alt his second James Beard Foundation Award.

== Early life and education ==
James Kenji Alt was born on October 31, 1979, in Boston, Massachusetts. He is the son of geneticist Frederick Alt and Keiko Nakanishi, and his maternal grandfather is Japanese organic chemist Koji Nakanishi. He and his sisters grew up in the Morningside Heights neighborhood of Manhattan, one floor above his maternal grandparents, both Japanese immigrants.

Alt attended the Dalton School, and graduated from Massachusetts Institute of Technology (MIT) in 2002, where he majored in architecture.

== Career ==
=== Early career (2000s to 2015) ===
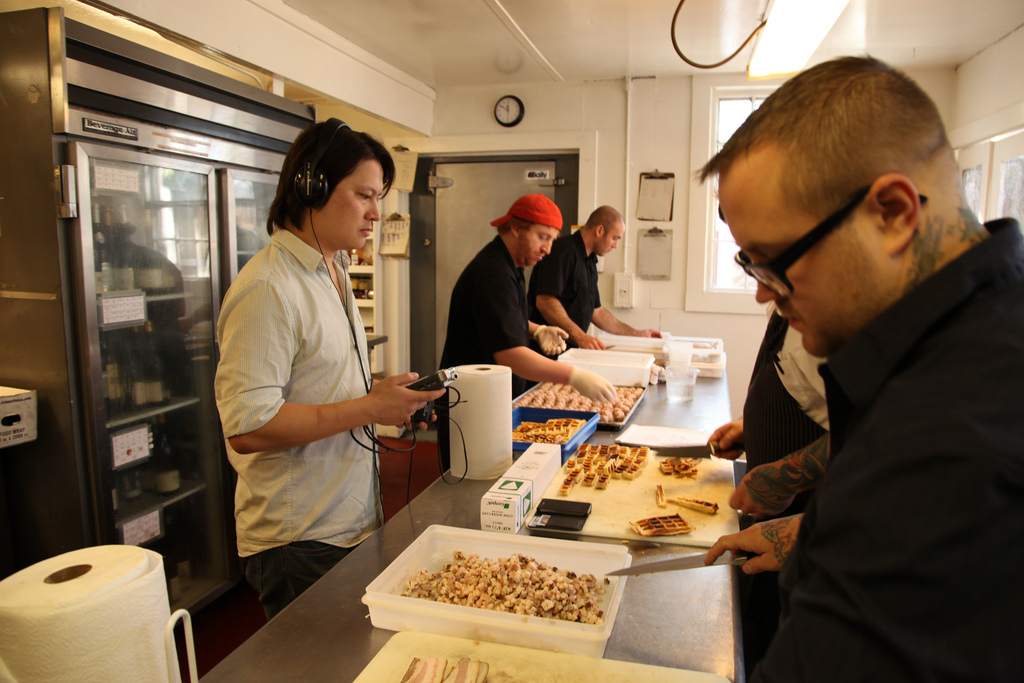
López-Alt in 2011 wearing headphones while holding an audio recorder for a Serious Eats video at the restaurant American Seasons in Nantucket, Massachusetts

Alt's first restaurant job was during his sophomore year of college. He attempted to take a job as a waiter at a local restaurant, but they needed a prep cook. He later worked with several Boston chefs including Barbara Lynch and Ken Oringer. He went on to work as a test cook and editor at Cook's Illustrated magazine and America's Test Kitchen.

López-Alt was the Managing Culinary Director and is the Chief Culinary Consultant of Serious Eats, a food blog, where he authored the James Beard Foundation Award–nominated column "The Food Lab". He later adapted this column into his first book, The Food Lab: Better Home Cooking Through Science, which was published in September 2015 by W. W. Norton & Company. It was a New York Times Bestseller and won the 2016 James Beard Foundation Award for General Cooking, as well as the International Association of Culinary Professionals awards for Best American Cookbook and Cookbook of the Year. Penny Pleasance of the New York Journal of Books called The Food Lab "a seminal work that is encyclopedic in scope and can be used as a reference by even the most experienced home cooks".

=== After The Food Lab (2016 to present) ===
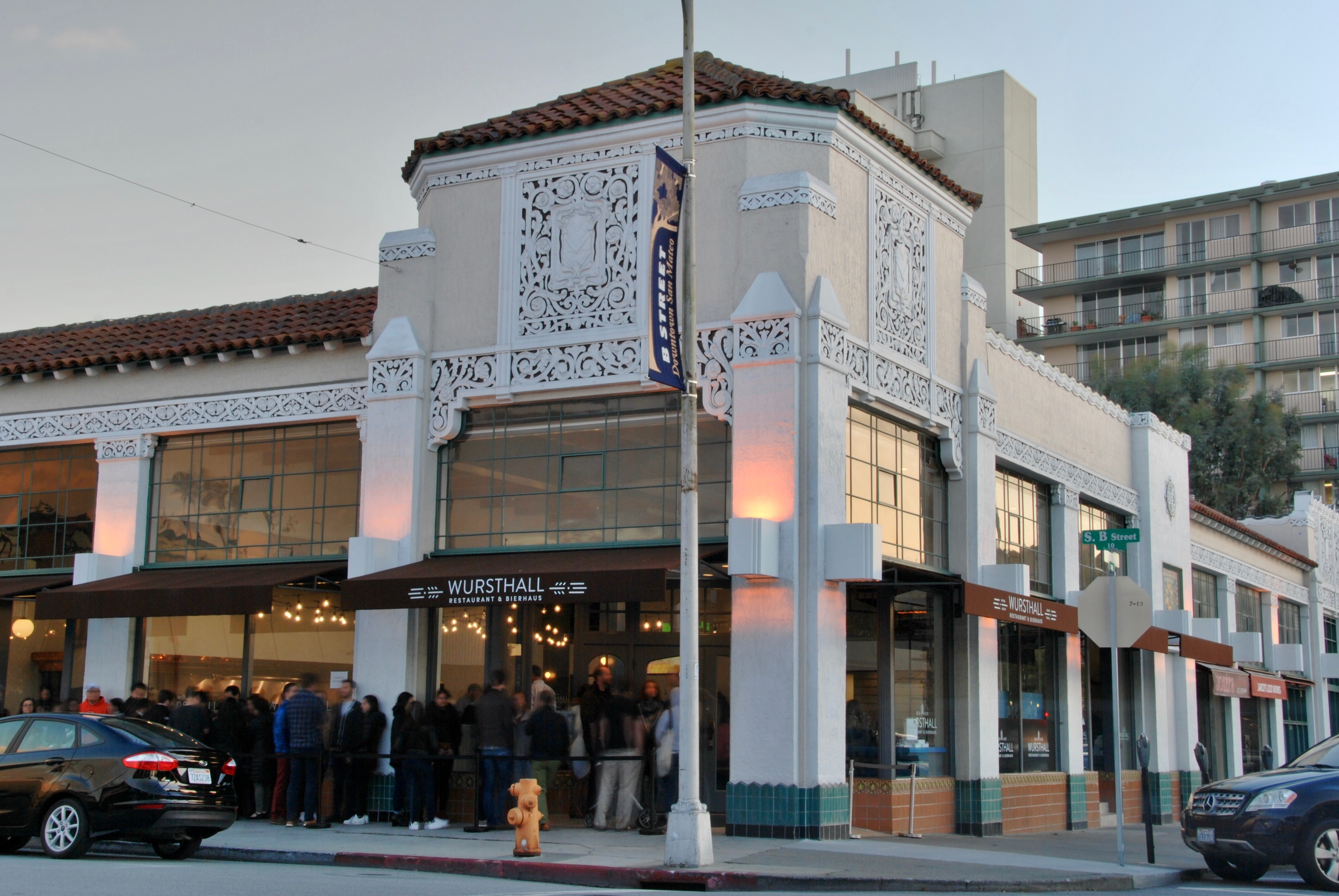
Wursthall Restaurant & Bierhaus

López-Alt opened the Wursthall Restaurant & Bierhaus in San Mateo, California, in 2017, with partners Adam Simpson and Tyson Mao. He left the restaurant in 2022 after moving to Seattle; the restaurant announced its permanent closure in September 2025.

López-Alt started a YouTube channel in 2016, which, as of August 2026, had over 1.7 million subscribers and over 290 million views. The videos are POV-style demonstrations of recipes and cooking techniques in López-Alt's home kitchen that feature unscripted commentary and largely unedited footage.

In September 2019, López-Alt became a monthly columnist at The New York Times Cooking.

In 2020 López-Alt released a children's book, Every Night is Pizza Night, which debuted on the New York Times Children's Bestseller list.

After his move to Seattle in late 2020, López-Alt's Instagram posts became increasingly popular as he recommended various businesses and dishes around the area, becoming "maybe the most powerful food influencer this city has seen in the social media age," according to The Seattle Times. He began a project to review every Seattle-style teriyaki restaurant in the city to highlight the local specialty.

In 2022, López-Alt released a cookbook titled The Wok: Recipes and Techniques, a 658-page book focused on woks. The Seattle Times called the book "arguably the most anticipated cookbook of the year" and it debuted at number one on the New York Times Bestseller list in the category of "Advice, How-To & Miscellaneous". It won the 2023 Pacific Northwest Book Award. The book won the 2023 James Beard Foundation Book Award in the category of "Single Subject".

He remains a regular guest on the Serious Eats podcast, Special Sauce, hosted by Ed Levine.

== Personal life ==
As of 2021, López-Alt resides in Seattle, Washington, after previously living in San Mateo, California, New York City, and Boston. He goes by his middle name Kenji in his personal life.

In 2009, Alt married Adriana López, a software engineer from Colombia, and they combined their surnames. The López-Alts have two children, the second of whom was born in September 2021. In an interview in March 2025, López-Alt referred to Adriana as his ex-wife.

In December 2024, López-Alt disclosed that he has been in recovery from alcoholism since October 2023.

In January 2019, López-Alt tweeted that "if you come to my restaurant wearing a MAGA cap, you aren't getting served, same as if you come in wearing a swastika, white hood, or any other symbol of intolerance and hate" and "If you’re comfortable sitting next to a MAGA wearer I’m probably not interested in serving you either." He later deleted the tweet and apologized to his staff for posting the tweet without consideration of their safety.

In 2022, López-Alt criticized Chinese-Malaysian comedian Nigel Ng's alter ego Uncle Roger, an old fashioned and chauvinistic Chinese uncle who speaks with a pronounced and exaggerated Cantonese accent and prides himself on various lost generation Chinese stereotypes. López-Alt said that "I don't like that [Ng's] schtick seems to give a free pass to people to imitate stereotypical Asian speech patterns and pronunciation, especially as it's almost always non-Asians doing the imitating. It's ugly, it's yellowface, it's not funny, and it promotes anti-Asian racism at a time when Asians are already being heavily discriminated against."

== Filmography ==
Year	Show title	Type	Notes
2016	The Chew	Television series	Seven episodes
2017	Guy’s Grocery Games	Television series	Season 14, Episode 1, “Blogger Battle” (competitor) & Season 14, Episode 3, “GGG Jrs.” (judge)
2019	The Burger Show	Television series	Season 3, Episode 3, "J. Kenji López-Alt Debunks Burger Myths"
2020	Somebody Feed Phil	Television series	Season 4, touring the Mission District
2023	Morimoto's Sushi Master	Television series	Six episodes; available on Roku

== Publications ==
- López-Alt, J. Kenji (2015). The Food Lab: Better Home Cooking Through Science (1st ed.). W. W. Norton & Company. ISBN 978-0393081084.
- López-Alt, J. Kenji (2017). Foreword. BraveTart: Iconic American Desserts. By Parks, Stella. W. W. Norton & Company. ISBN 978-0393239867.
- López-Alt, J. Kenji (2020). Every Night Is Pizza Night. Illustrations by Gianna Ruggiero. Norton Young Readers. ISBN 978-1324005254.
- López-Alt, J. Kenji; Killingsworth, Silvia, eds. (2020). The Best American Food Writing 2020. Mariner Books. ISBN 978-0358344582.
- López-Alt, J. Kenji (2022). The Wok: Recipes and Techniques. W. W. Norton & Company. ISBN 978-0393541212.
