= Yi Won (writer) =

South Korean poet (born 1968)

Yi Won (born 1968) is a South Korean poet. She was born in 1968 in Hwaseong, Gyeonggi-do, and she graduated from Seoul Institute of the Arts in creative writing. She received a master's degree in creative writing from Dongguk University. She began her career in poetry when she published "Sigangwa binilbongji" (시간과 비닐봉지 Time and the Plastic Bag) and 3 other poems in the 1992 Fall issue of the quarterly journal Segye-ui Munhak. Though she became known as a poet that writes about human characters in the age of technological advancement, recently she has been writing much about the underlying loneliness of humanity.

== Life ==
Yi Won (born 1968) is a South Korean poet. She was born in 1968 in Hwaseong, Gyeonggi-do, but she grew up in Seoul. She graduated from Seoul Institute of the Arts in creative writing, and afterwards she received a master's degree in creative writing from Dongguk University's Graduate School of Culture & Arts. She began her career in poetry when she published "Sigangwa binilbongji" (시간과 비닐봉지 Time and the Plastic Bag) and 4 other poems in the 1992 Fall issue of Segye-ui Munhak. In 2002 she was awarded the Contemporary Poetics Award, and in 2005 the Contemporary Poetry Award. She has published Yahoo!ui gangmul-e cheongae-ui dali tteunda (야후!의 강물에 천개의 달이 뜬다 A Thousands Moons Rising Over the River of Yahoo!; 2001), Sesang-eseo gajang gabyeo-un otobai (세상에서 가장 가벼운 오토바이 The World's Lightest Motorcycle), Bulganeunghan jongi-ui yeoksa (불가능한 종이의 역사 The History of the Impossible Paper; 2012), and Geudeuli jigureul jibaehaeteul ttae (그들이 지구를 지배했을 때 When They Ruled the Earth; 2015). Though she became known as a poet that writes about human characters in the age of technological advancement, recently she has been writing much about the underlying loneliness of humanity.

== Writing ==
In her first poetry collection Geudeuli jigureul jibaehaeteul ttae (그들이 지구를 지배했을 때 When They Ruled the Earth), Yi Won often uses the image of electronic technology, a product of digital civilization. Those images become a device to criticize the atmosphere of today's age. In her poetry, life is where people are controlled by a digital matrix and value. Yi Won describes the familiar but unfamiliar world within the digital system as 'the electronic desert'. Her poetry showed the despair and sadness of lonely, desolate and forlorn individuals thrown in the barren 'desert'. This type of critical mindset continues in her second poetry collection Yahoo!ui gangmul-e cheongae-ui dali tteunda (야후!의 강물에 천개의 달이 뜬다 A Thousands Moons Rising Over the River of Yahoo!). Among the Korean literary world of the 1990s, where there was a lot of monologue type poetry that withdrew into the inner side, Yi Won was the just about the only poet who wrote with the digital civilization in mind. Though, it is hard to consider that her works simply jumped on the development of IT technology. Her interest was in the problem of what type of existence people should lead in the age where digital civilization suddenly rose. Technological advancements offered people conveniences, but it also gave people the feeling that they were beings that drifted across the Internet, similar to data, unable to anchor onto their physical selves. Yi Won acutely captured what sensations are felt by people that have become cyborgs within such a modern society, and how they feel their physical bodies. On the other hand, in Sesang-eseo gajang gabyeo-un otobai (세상에서 가장 가벼운 오토바이 The World's Lightest Motorcycle), and Bulganeunghan jongi-ui yeoksa (불가능한 종이의 역사 The History of the Impossible Paper), she does not directly reveal her interest in digital civilization. Instead, the poet faces the underlying loneliness of human beings, and attempts to find the meaning of existence from scars and absence.

== Works ==
=== Poetry collections ===
- Geudeuli jigureul jibaehaeteul ttae (그들이 지구를 지배했을 때 When They Ruled the Earth), Moonji Publishing, 1996.
- Yahoo!ui gangmul-e cheongae-ui dali tteunda (야후!의 강물에 천개의 달이 뜬다 A Thousands Moons Rising Over the River of Yahoo!), Moonji Publishing, 2001.
- Sesang-eseo gajang gabyeo-un otobai (세상에서 가장 가벼운 오토바이 The World's Lightest Motorcycle), Moonji Publishing, 2007.
- Bulganeunghan jongi-ui yeoksa (불가능한 종이의 역사 The History of the Impossible Paper), Moonji Publishing, 2012.

=== Essay collections ===
- Sanchaek an-e dameun geotdeul (산책 안에 담은 것들 Everything in a Walk), Sejong Books, 2016.

== Awards ==
- 2002 Contemporary Poetics Award
- 2005 Contemporary Poetry Award
