= When You Trap a Tiger =

2020 children's book by Tae Keller

- Author: Tae Keller
- Language: English
- Publisher: Random House
- Publication date: January 28, 2020
- Publication place: United States
- Pages: 304
- Awards: Newbery Medal (2021)
- ISBN: 978-1-5247-1570-0

When You Trap a Tiger is a 2020 children's book by Tae Keller. The novel tells the story of a biracial girl, Lily, who learns about her heritage when her family moves in with Lily's Korean grandmother. The book was well received and won the 2021 Newbery Medal as well as the 2021 Asian/Pacific American Award for Children's Literature.

== Plot ==
12-year-old Lily and her family move in with her ailing grandmother. Suddenly, a mythical tiger from Korean folklore appears. This encounter leads Lily to discover a hidden family secret: her grandmother once took something from the tigers. Now, the tigers are demanding its return in exchange for her grandmother's health. This difficult choice leaves Lily paralyzed with indecision. However, she soon realizes that deals with mystical creatures are rarely straightforward. With the support of her sister and a new friend, Ricky, Lily must overcome her fears and find the strength to confront the tiger and resolve the situation.

== Reception ==
=== Critical reception ===
When You Trap a Tiger was on The New York Times Best Seller list and received starred reviews from Kirkus Reviews, Booklist, Publishers Weekly, and School Library Journal.

=== Awards ===
The book won the 2021 Newbery Medal, and the Asian/Pacific American Award for Children's Literature.

Awards
Preceded by New Kid	Newbery Medal recipient 2021	Succeeded by The Last Cuentista
