= Ed Levine =

American food writer

Ed Levine (born January 27, 1952) is the creator/founder of Serious Eats, the author of the entrepreneurial memoir Serious Eater: A Food Lover's Quest for Pizza and Redemption (Portfolio Penguin/Random House, 2019), and the host of the podcast Special Sauce. He was formerly a frequent The New York Times contributor. His stories on iconic American foods such as pizza, hot dogs, hamburgers, ice cream and cheesecake have appeared in many U.S. periodicals, including GQ, BusinessWeek and The New York Times. In 2016, Levine was inducted into the James Beard Foundation's Who's Who of Food & Beverage in America.

== Education ==
Levine grew up in Cedarhurst, New York, and graduated from Fairfax High School in Los Angeles in 1969. He attended Grinnell College in Iowa with a BA in music, and in 1985, earned his MBA from Columbia Business School.

== Food criticism ==
Serious Eats has been praised by PBS's MediaShift as “the next generation of food media.” In 1997, Gourmet editor Ruth Reichl called Levine “the curator of New York's far-flung food museum” and “a missionary of the delicious…on a crusade to see that the people who make food get the recognition they deserve.”

== Television and radio ==
He started the podcast Special Sauce With Ed Levine in 2015 in which he speaks to chefs, restaurateurs, actors and other cultural figures about their relationships to food. The first episode features a conversation with Phil Rosenthal, creator of the television sitcom Everybody Loves Raymond. Special Sauce is produced by PRX.

== Selected writings ==
- Levine, Ed (December 31, 2003). "Was Life Better When Bagels Were Smaller?". The New York Times.
- "Lo, a New Age of Heroes" December 1, 2004
- "It's All in How the Dog Is Served" May 25, 2005
- "Soul for the Chicken Soup" February 22, 2006

== Bibliography ==
- New York Eats, 1992, St. Martin's Griffin
- New York Eats (More), 1997, St. Martin's Griffin
- Pizza: A Slice of Heaven, 2005, Universe Publishing
- The Young Man and the Sea, 2007, Artisan Publishing
- Serious Eater: A Food Lover's Perilous Quest for Pizza and Redemption, 2019, Portfolio/Penguin
