= Feeling Good: The New Mood Therapy =

Book by David D. Burns

- First edition
- Author: David D. Burns
- Language: English
- Subject: Cognitive therapy
- Publisher: William Morrow and Company
- Publication date: 1980
- Publication place: United States
- ISBN: 0-688-03633-3

Feeling Good: The New Mood Therapy is a book written by David D. Burns, first published in 1980, that popularized cognitive behavioral therapy (CBT).

== Origins ==
Feeling Good grew out of dissatisfaction with conventional Freudian treatment of depression. Burns's mentor, Aaron T. Beck (considered the "father" of cognitive therapy; Albert Ellis is considered the "grandfather"), concluded that there was no empirical evidence for the success of Freudian psychoanalysis in treating depressed people. The idea that negative feelings such as depression and anxiety are triggered by thoughts or perceptions has a long history, dating back to the Greek philosopher Epictetus, who said that people are disturbed not by things but by the way we think about them.

== Popularity ==
The book has sold over four million copies in the United States, and has also been published in Argentina, Australia, Austria, Canada, China, France, Germany, India, Indonesia, Iran, Israel, Japan, Korea, Mexico, Norway, Poland, Portugal, Spain, Yugoslavia and many other countries. It was named one of the top ten behavioral science books of 1980 by the journal Behavioral Medicine, while according to The Authoritative Guide to Self-Help Books (New York: Guilford Press, 1994) it is the book most frequently recommended for depressed patients by mental health professionals in the United States. A commentary on Feeling Good is included in 50 Psychology Classics (2006) by Tom Butler-Bowdon.

== Benefits of bibliotherapy ==
Evidence from six studies suggests that reading Feeling Good as a form of self-directed bibliotherapy had a large helpful effect on treating depression. Evidence from eleven studies supports bibliotherapy generally, when people also have additional guidance. The evidence was limited, because all trials completed only had a small number of participants.

One of these studies found that in older adults with mild to moderate depression, reading Feeling Good with brief intermittent phone check-in sessions was an effective treatment for depression.

In her text on Cognitive Therapy, Beck's daughter Judith S. Beck recommends it as a "layman's book" to be used by patients undergoing CBT.

== The Feeling Good Handbook ==
The Feeling Good Handbook
- First edition
- Author: David D. Burns
- Language: English
- Subject: Cognitive therapy
- Publisher: William Morrow and Company
- Publication date: 1989
- Publication place: United States
- ISBN: 0-688-01745-2
- Dewey Decimal: 616.89142

The Feeling Good Handbook, also by David D. Burns, includes an explanation of the principles of cognitive behavioral therapy, and details ways to improve a person's mood and life by identifying and eliminating common cognitive distortions, as well as methods to improve communication skills. Exercises are presented throughout the book to assist the reader in identifying cognitive distortions and replace them with healthy beliefs.

A revised edition was published in 1999 (ISBN 978-0-452-28132-5).

=== Efficacy ===
The approach of using supported bibliotherapy on the topic of CBT was the subject of a randomised controlled trial, in which patients on a waiting list to receive counselling for depression were given a copy of a similar book (Overcoming Depression: A Five Areas Approach). The patients dramatically reduced their scores on depression tests compared to a control group.

In 2013, the book was one of 30 titles approved by The Reading Agency as part of a project to recommend self-help books to people with mental health issues.
