= David D. Burns =

American professor of psychiatry

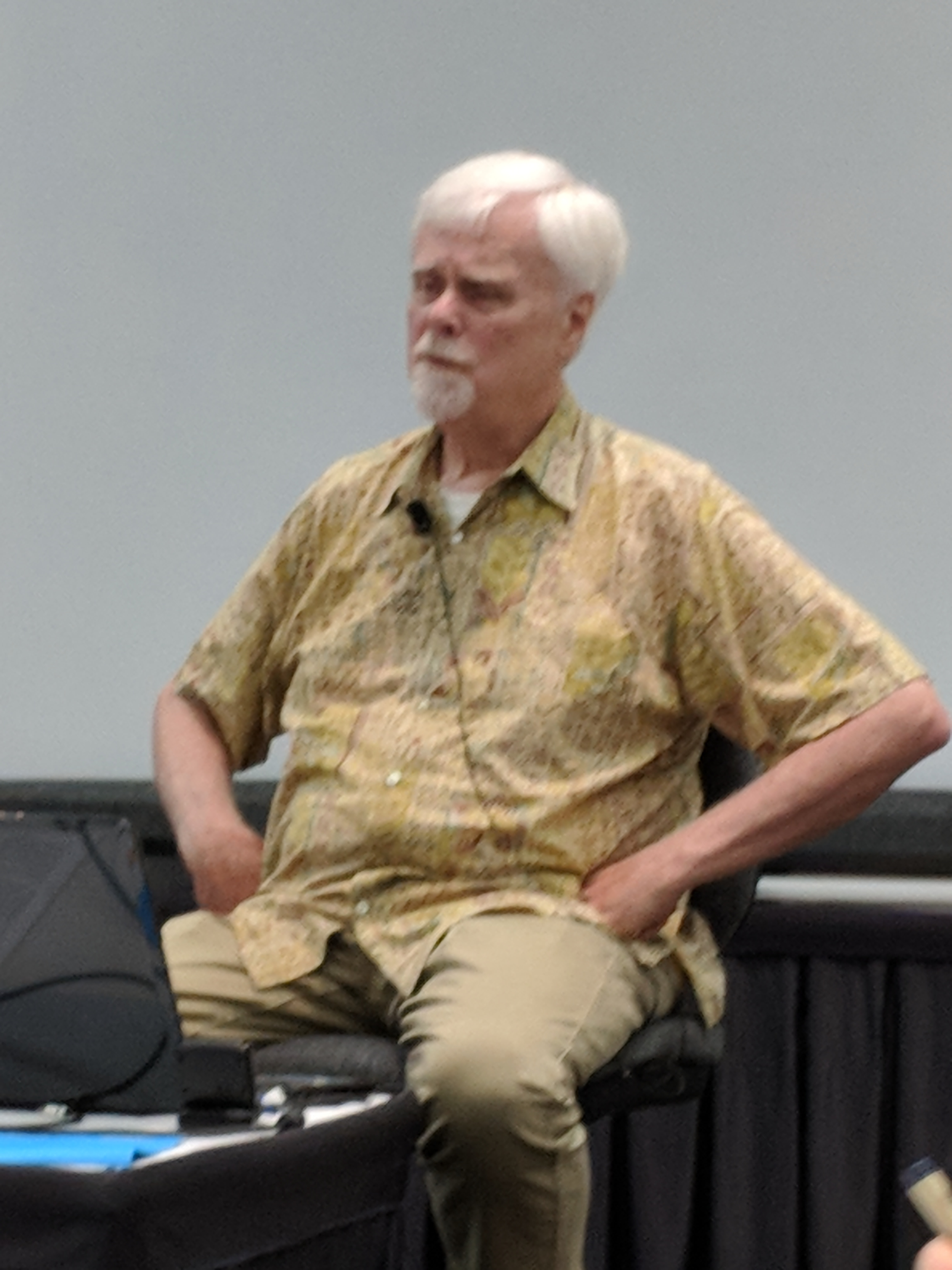
- Burns in August 2018
- Born: September 19, 1942 (age 84)
- Education: Amherst College (BA); Stanford University (MD); University of Pennsylvania
- Scientific career
- Fields: Behavioral psychology
- Workplaces: Stanford University
- Academic advisors: Aaron T. Beck
- Website: https://feelinggood.com/

David D. Burns (born September 19, 1942) is an American psychiatrist and adjunct professor emeritus in the Department of Psychiatry and Behavioral Sciences at the Stanford University School of Medicine. He is the author of bestselling books such as Feeling Good: The New Mood Therapy, The Feeling Good Handbook and Feeling Great: The Revolutionary New Treatment for Depression and Anxiety.

Burns popularized Albert Ellis's and Aaron T. Beck's cognitive behavioral therapy (CBT) when his books became bestsellers during the 1980s. In a January 2021 interview, Burns attributed his rise in popularity and much of his success to an appearance in 1988 on The Phil Donahue Show, to which he was invited by the producer after helping her teenage son with depression.

== Early life and education ==
Burns's father was a Lutheran minister.

Burns received his B.A. from Amherst College in 1964 and his M.D. from the Stanford University School of Medicine in 1970. He completed his residency training in psychiatry in 1974 at the University of Pennsylvania School of Medicine, and was certified by the American Board of Psychiatry and Neurology in 1976. Burns is the author of numerous research studies, book chapters and books. He also gives lectures and conducts many psychotherapy training workshops for mental health professionals throughout the United States and Canada each year. He has won many awards for his research and teaching, and has been named "Teacher of the Year" three times by the graduating class of psychiatric residents at the University of Pennsylvania School of Medicine.

Burns was an early student of Aaron T. Beck, who developed cognitive therapy during the 1960s and 1970s. Cognitive therapy was also based on the pioneering work of Albert Ellis during the 1950s, who popularized the notion that our thoughts and beliefs create our moods. However, the basic concept behind cognitive therapy goes all the way back to Epictetus, the Greek philosopher. Nearly 2,000 years ago he wrote that people are disturbed not by things, but by the views we take of them. In other words, our thoughts (or "cognitions") create all of our feelings. Thus when we make healthy changes in the way we think, we experience healthy changes in the way we feel.

== Research and clinical practice ==
=== Research on antidepressants ===
Burns is critical on existing antidepressant medication. In published research and in his blog he contends that most research on antidepressants is plagued by many drug-favoring biases, among them the lack of active placebos in double-blind studies, use of flawed assessment instruments like the Hamilton Rating Scale for Depression, non-systematic recording of adverse effects, use of "placebo washout" periods to exclude placebo responders, selective publication and submission of results, strong economic interests involved.

Citing also research by Irving Kirsch and others, he claims that "the chemicals called "antidepressants" may, in reality, have few or no true antidepressant effects above and beyond their placebo effects", and that their adverse effects, including suicidal behavior, may be currently underestimated.

=== TEAM ===
Burns developed an approach to psychotherapy called T.E.A.M. Therapy. T.E.A.M. is an acronym denoting: Testing, Empathy, Assessment of Resistance (formerly Agenda Setting) and Methods. TEAM claims to address some of the shortcomings in cognitive therapy, and proposes that motivation influences our thoughts, feelings, and actions just as much as our thoughts (or cognitions). Burns states that he draws from at least 15 schools of therapy, and hopes that the TEAM approach will be as revolutionary a breakthrough in psychotherapy as CBT was decades ago.

=== Stanford ===
Burns is on the voluntary faculty of the Stanford University School of Medicine, where he is actively involved in research and training. He has also served as a statistical consultant for Stanford's new Center for Interdisciplinary Brain Sciences Research. He has also served as Visiting Scholar at the Harvard Medical School and Acting Chief of Psychiatry at the Presbyterian / University of Pennsylvania Medical Center in Philadelphia.

=== Burns Depression Checklist ===
The Burns Depression Checklist (BDC) is a rating scale for depression copyrighted by Burns. The 1984 version was a 15-question survey; the 1996 revision is a 25-question survey. Each question is answered in the context of "during the past week, including today" and on a scale of 0 to 4, with 0 being "not at all" and 4 being "extremely." For Burns, the BDC replaced Aaron Beck's BDI which appeared in the 1980 edition of Feeling Good (that Burns says he was grateful for permission to reproduce).

Burns has also developed brief scales to measure depression, suicidal urges, anxiety, anger, and relationship satisfaction, as well as scales to assess the quality of the therapeutic alliance and effectiveness. These scales can be completed by patients and scored in less than 15 seconds. Burns and his colleagues require patients to complete these instruments in the waiting room just before and after each therapy session, so therapists can see how much progress the patient has made, or failed to make. Based on this information, therapists can change strategies if needed. Patients also rate therapists on warmth, empathy, and helpfulness in the waiting room after each session so therapists can see with much greater accuracy how their patients feel about them and the therapy.

== Awards and honors ==
- 1975: Winner of A. E. Bennett Award for Basic Psychiatric Research (Society of Biological Psychiatry)
- 1991: Commendation from the Georgia State Senate "for contributions ... helping people overcome emotional troubles ... in times of trouble and anguish." (State Resolution 15 EX)
- 1995: Distinguished Contribution to Psychology through the Media Award from the American Association of Applied and Preventive Psychology
- 1998, 2000, and 2002: Recognition of excellence in teaching (Clinical Faculty Teacher of the Year Award), Department of Psychiatry and Behavioral Sciences, Stanford University School of Medicine
- 2002: Outstanding Contributions Award from the National Association of Cognitive-Behavioral Therapists, for "outstanding contributions & dedication to the theory and practice of cognitive behavioral psychotherapy."

== Books ==
- Burns, D. D. (1980). Feeling Good: The New Mood Therapy (preface by Aaron T. Beck). New York: Wm. Morrow and Co. (hardbound); New American Library, 1981 (paperback). Revised and updated, 1999. — ISBN 0-380-81033-6
- Burns, D. D. (1984). Intimate Connections. New York: William Morrow and Co. (hardbound); New American Library, 1985 (paperback). — ISBN 0-451-14845-2
- Burns, D. D. (1989). The Feeling Good Handbook. New York: William Morrow and Co., (hardbound); Plume, 1990 (trade paperback) Revised and updated, 1999. — ISBN 0-452-28132-6
- Burns, D. D. (1993). Ten Days to Self-Esteem. New York: Quill. 1999. Revised edition. — ISBN 0-688-09455-4
- Burns, D. D. (1993). Ten Days to Self-Esteem: The Leader's Manual. New York: Quill. — ISBN 0-688-12708-8
- Burns, D. D. (1995). Therapist's Toolkit: Comprehensive Treatment and Assessment Tools for the Mental Health Professional. Philadelphia: Author. Updated in 1997 and 2006.
- Burns, D. D. (2002). Let's Get Started. Alexandria: Time-Life Inc.
- Burns, D. D. (2002). Fifty Ways to Untwist Your Thinking. Alexandria: Time-Life Inc.
- Burns, D. D. (2002). Selecting the Techniques that Will Work for You. Alexandria: Time-Life Inc.
- Burns, D. D. (2006). When Panic Attacks. New York: Morgan Road Books. — ISBN 0-7679-2071-6
- Burns, D. D. (2008). Feeling Good Together. New York: Broadway Books. – ISBN 978-0-7679-2070-4
- Burns, D. D. (2020). Feeling Great: The Revolutionary New Treatment for Depression and Anxiety. Wisconsin: PESI Publishing & Media. – (hardback) ISBN 9781683732884 – (ebook) ISBN 9781683732891

== Audio ==
- Burns, D.D. (2006). When Panic Attacks: The New, Drug-Free Anxiety Treatment That Can Change Your Life (CD). HarperAudio, 2006. – ISBN 0-06-057710-X

== See also ==
- Aaron T. Beck
- Albert Ellis
- Cognitive therapy
- William Glasser
