= Kathleen Flenniken =

American poet

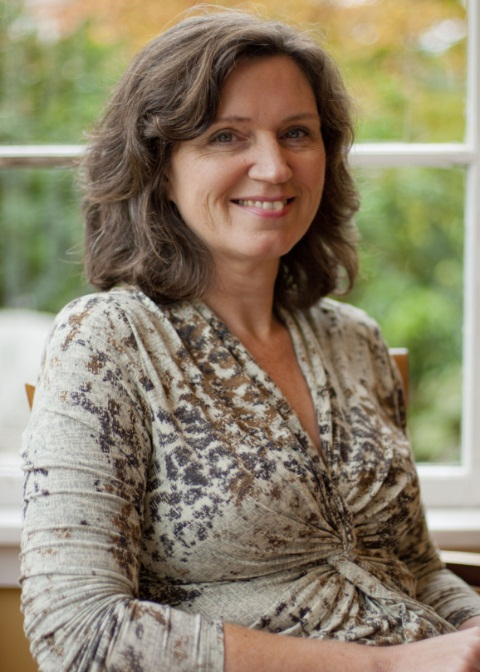
- Kathleen Flenniken, 2012
- Born: Kathleen Lyall Dillon; October 30, 1960 (age 65); Richland, Washington
- Education: Washington State University (BS); University of Washington (MS); Pacific Lutheran University (MFA)
- Occupations: Poet, writer, editor, and educator
- Spouse: Steve Flenniken
- Children: 3
- Writing career
- Genre: Poetry
- Notable awards: Pushcart Prize, NEA Fellowship, American Library Association Notable Book Award, Prairie Schooner Book Prize, Washington State Book Award
- Website: www.kathleenflenniken.com

Kathleen Flenniken (born October 30, 1960) is an American writer, poet, editor, and educator. In 2012, she was named the Poet Laureate of Washington. She has been honored with a 2012 Pushcart Prize, as well as fellowships with the Artist Trust (Washington State Arts Commission), and the National Endowment for the Arts. Her collection of poetry titled Famous, received the 2005 Prairie Schooner Book Prize in Poetry. Her following work, Plume, was honored with the 2013 Washington State Book Award.

== Personal background ==
Kathleen (née Dillon) Flenniken was born on October 30, 1960, in Richland, Washington. She is the daughter of Robert and Kathleen (née Melville) Dillon. Her father was a PhD Chemist, working at the Hanford Nuclear Reservation in southeastern Washington state. In 1978, she graduated from Columbia High School. In 1983, she earned a Bachelor of Science in Civil Engineering from Washington State University. In 1986, she moved to Seattle, where she earned a Master of Science in Civil Engineering in 1988 from the University of Washington. In 2007, she earned a Masters of Fine Arts degree in Creative Writing from Pacific Lutheran University. In 1986, she married Steve Flenniken. They have three children.

== Professional background ==
Writing

Her collection of poetry titled Famous, received the 2005 Prairie Schooner Book Prize in Poetry. In 2007, the work was named a Notable Book by the American Library Association. In 2012, the University of Washington Press published her second book of poetry, titled Plume. The work was honored with the 2013 Washington State Book Award. It was also a finalist for the 2013 Pacific Northwest Booksellers Association Award and the William Carlos Williams Award, presented by the Poetry Society of America. In 2012, she was named one of Seattle Magazine's Spotlight Award winners, while the following year, she was named a Distinguished Visiting Poet at Seattle University.

In 2012, she was named the Washington State Poet Laureate, which is recognized through 2014. As poet laureate, she reaches out to students throughout the state. She teaches poetry through an affiliation with arts agencies, including Writers in the Schools and the Jack Straw Foundation. In addition to her writing, Flenniken has worked as an engineer and hydrologist (three projects at the Hanford Nuclear Reservation). As of 2013, she lives in the Seattle area, where she is the president and editor of the Floating Bridge Press, which focuses on publishing the creative works of Washington State poets. She is also the president of a nonprofit media arts studio and cultural center known as Jack Straw Foundation.

== Honors and awards ==
- 2003: Artist Trust (Washington State Arts Commission) Literature Fellowship
- 2005: National Endowment for the Arts Literary Fellowship in Poetry
- 2005: Prairie Schooner Book Prize in Poetry for Famous
- 2007: American Library Association Notable Book Award for Famous
- 2007: Washington State Book Award for Famous (finalist)
- 2012: Pushcart Prize for "Horse Latitudes"
- 2012: Seattle Magazine "Spotlight Award"
- 2012: Washington State Poet Laureate (2012–2014 term)
- 2013: Washington State Book Award for Plume
- 2013: Pacific Northwest Booksellers Association Award for Plume (finalist)
- 2013: William Carlos Williams Award – Poetry Society of America for Plume (finalist)

== Published works ==
Books

- Flenniken, Kathleen (2006). Famous, (Prairie Schooner Book Prize in Poetry), Bison Books, 76 pages. ISBN 978-0803269248
- Flenniken, Kathleen (2012). Plume, (Pacific Northwest Poetry Series), University of Washington Press, 80 pages. ISBN 978-0295991535
