= The Food Lab =

2015 cookbook

The Food Lab: Better Home Cooking Through Science
- Authors: J. Kenji Lopez-Alt
- Language: English
- Subject: Cookbook
- Publisher: W. W. Norton & Company
- Publication date: September 21, 2015
- Publication place: America
- Media type: Print, ebook
- Pages: 960 (print edition)
- Award: 2016 IACP Cookbook of the Year; 2016 James Beard Foundation General Cooking cookbook award
- ISBN: 978-0393081084

The Food Lab: Better Home Cooking Through Science is a 2015 cookbook written by American chef J. Kenji Lopez-Alt. The book contains close to 300 savory American cuisine recipes. The Food Lab expands on Lopez-Alt's "The Food Lab" column on the Serious Eats blog. Lopez-Alt uses the scientific method in the cookbook to improve popular American recipes and to explain the science of cooking. The Food Lab charted on The New York Times Best Seller list, and won the 2016 James Beard Foundation Award for the best General Cooking cookbook and the 2016 IACP awards for the Cookbook of the Year and the best American cookbook.

Lopez-Alt developed the cookbook over a five-year period. He described the book not as a recipe book but as "a book for people who want to learn the hows and the whys of cooking". The recipes in The Food Lab are arranged by the technique used to prepare them. The cookbook also contains charts and experiments aimed at explaining scientific concepts like the difference between temperature and energy and the Leidenfrost effect.

== Reception ==
Emily Weinstein of The New York Times wrote that "the recipes are sophisticated in their grasp of how ingredients and techniques work" but noted that "it is Mr. López-Alt's original, living body of work online that to many may seem like his even greater achievement". Eric Vellend of The Globe and Mail wrote that "Lopez-Alt's relentless pursuit of perfection yields hundreds of unconventional kitchen tricks". Silvia Killingsworth wrote in The New Yorker that The Food Lab resembles a "hybrid reference text" more than a cookbook, and that "Kenji's appeal is that he channels the shameless geekery of hobbyists everywhere into inexpensive, everyday foods". Penny Pleasance of the New York Journal of Books called The Food Lab "a seminal work that is encyclopedic in scope and can be used as a reference by even the most experienced home cooks".
