= Stella Parks =

American pastry chef and food writer

- Born: Kentucky

Stella Parks is an American pastry chef and food writer based in Kentucky. She has worked in various Lexington-area restaurants, notably Table 310, and was a longtime contributor to Serious Eats. Parks received a James Beard Foundation Award in 2018 for her bestselling cookbook BraveTart: Iconic American Desserts.

== Early life and education ==
Stella Parks was born in Kentucky, where she grew up in Versailles. She began working in restaurants at the age of 14.

Immediately after graduating from high school, Parks left to study at the Culinary Institute of America. She graduated in 2002 from the school's baking and pastry program.

== Restaurant career ==
Parks worked in a variety of restaurants in the Lexington, Kentucky, area, including Wallace Station and the Holly Hill Inn. She also spent time in Tokyo, moving there to study Japanese as part of a self-described "quarter-life crisis."

In 2010, she was hired to work at the new Lexington restaurant Table 310 as its pastry chef. In 2012, she was named one of America's Best New Pastry Chefs by Food & Wine magazine in recognition of her work at Table 310.

== Writing ==
As part of a project with a photographer friend, Parks started her food blog BraveTart in 2010. A year later, she began writing a "BraveTart" column at the food website Serious Eats. She became a longtime contributor to the publication, where she served as a senior editor and was dubbed the website's "pastry wizard," though she has continued to be based in Lexington. After contributing to Serious Eats from 2011 to 2019, with three years as its pastry editor, Parks became editor emeritus at the site.

Parks's work combines baking, history, and science. She is known for developing precise, complex recipes that often elevate American childhood favorite desserts through copycat recipes.

In 2017, Parks published her debut cookbook, BraveTart: Iconic American Desserts. She spent six years working on the book, which involved archival research as well as recipe testing. The cookbook celebrates iconic American desserts and explores the history of the commercial food industry's influence on home baking. The BraveTart cookbook became a New York Times bestseller and was well received by critics. It was described as "the most groundbreaking book on baking in years" by Saveur and "one of the greatest dessert books of our time" by Bon Appétit. In 2018, Parks's BraveTart: Iconic American Desserts won a James Beard Foundation Award for Best Baking and Dessert Book.

After stepping back from Serious Eats in 2019, Parks entered what she dubbed her "hermit era," focusing on a less deadline-driven life balance.
