= Marci Calabretta Cancio-Bello =

American poet

Marci Calabretta Cancio-Bello is an American poet, radio show producer, and professor. She is the author of Hour of the Ox, which won the 2015 AWP Donald Hall Prize for Poetry.

== Education ==
Cancio-Bello received her MFA in creative writing in 2014 from Florida International University and her BA in English in 2011 from Carnegie Mellon University.

== Awards and honors ==
- Kundiman Fellowship
- Academy of American Poets Prize
- James L. Knight Fellowship
- Best New Poets 2015
