= Pacific Northwest Booksellers Association Award =

Annual literary award

The Pacific Northwest Booksellers Association Award, also known as the Pacific Northwest Book Award (PNBA), is an annual award presented by the Pacific Northwest Booksellers Association to recognize "excellence in writing" from the Pacific Northwest. The award recognizes authors from the Pacific Northwest, including Washington, Oregon, Alaska, Montana, Idaho, and British Columbia. The PNBA was first awarded in 1964 and is presented annually at the association's Spring Trade Show. Past recipients include Chuck Palahniuk, Dana Simpson, Kim Barnes, Erik Larson, E.J. Koh, Karl Marlantes, Timothy Egan, Kathleen Flenniken, Donna Barba Higuera, Jonathan Raban and Lidia Yuknavitch.

== Winners ==
Up to six books are awarded annually.

Year	Winner(s)
2018	You Don't Have to Say You Love Me by Sherman Alexie; American War by Omar El Akkad; The Book of Mistakes by Corinna Luyken; Dead Feminists: Historic Heroines in Living Color by Chandler O'Leary and Jessica Spring; Idaho by Emily Ruskovich; Tides: The Science and Spirit of the Ocean by Jonathon White
2019	A False Report: A True Story of Rape in America by Ken Armstrong and T. Christian Miller; Washington Black by Esi Edugyan; Buzz: The Nature and Necessity of Bees by Thor Hanson; Blood Water Paint by Joy McCullough; Rising Out of Hatred: The Awakening of a Former White Nationalist by Eli Saslow; Libba: The Magnificent Musical Life of Elizabeth Cotten by Laura Veirs; illustrated by Tatyana Fazlalizadeh
2020	The Death & Life of Aida Hernandez: A Border Story by Aaron Bobrow-Strain; Exhalation: Stories by Ted Chiang; Is, Is Not by Tess Gallagher; My Heart by Corinna Luyken; Queen of the Sea by Dylan Meconis; The Cassandra by Sharma Shields
2021	Lupe Wong Won't Dance by Donna Barba Higuera; This Is My America by Kim Johnson; The Magical Language of Others by E.J. Koh; Mexican Gothic by Silvia Moreno-Garcia; rough house by Tina Ontiveros; Cemetery Boys by Aiden Thomas
2022	Unfollow Me: Essays On Complicity by Jill Louise Busby; Cloud Cuckoo Land by Anthony Doerr; What Strange Paradise by Omar El Akkad; Time Is A Flower by Julie Morstad; Funeral for Flaca by Emily Prado; Iron Widow by Xiran Jay Zhao
2023	The Many Daughters of Afong Moy by Jamie Ford; Lesser Known Monsters of the 21st Century by Kim Fu; Red Paint: The Ancestral Autobiography of a Coast Salish Punk by Sasha taqʷšəblu (taqwšəblu) LaPointe; The Wok: Recpies & Techniques by J. Kenji López-Alt; Ma And Me by Putsata Reang; The Necessity of Wildfire by Caitlin Scarano
2024	Weird Rules to Follow by Kim Spencer; The Lost Journals of Sacajewea by Debra Magpie Earling; Cascadia Field Guide edited by Elizabeth Bradfield, Derek Sheffield, and CMarie Fuhrman; Meet Me Tonight in Atlantic City by Jane Wong; You Just Need to Lose Weight: And 19 Other Myths about Fat People by Aubrey Gordon; Doppelganger: A Trip into the Mirror World by Naomi Klein
2025	Eve: How the Female Body Drove 200 Million Years of Human Evolution by Cat Bohannon; It Lasts Forever and Then It's Over by Anne de Marcken; Log Life by Amy Hevron; Coexistence by Silly-Ray Belcourt; Becoming Little Shell: A Landless Indian's Journey Home by Chris La Tray; Wild and Distant Seas by Tara Karr Roberts
2026	One Day, Everyone Will Have Always Been Against This by Omar El Akkad; Seattle Samurai by Kelly Goto; Sinkhole, and Other Inexplicable Voids by Leyna Krow; The Antidote by Karen Russell; Speechless by Aron Nels Steinke; Wrecked by Coll Thrush
