= Tae Keller =

American author

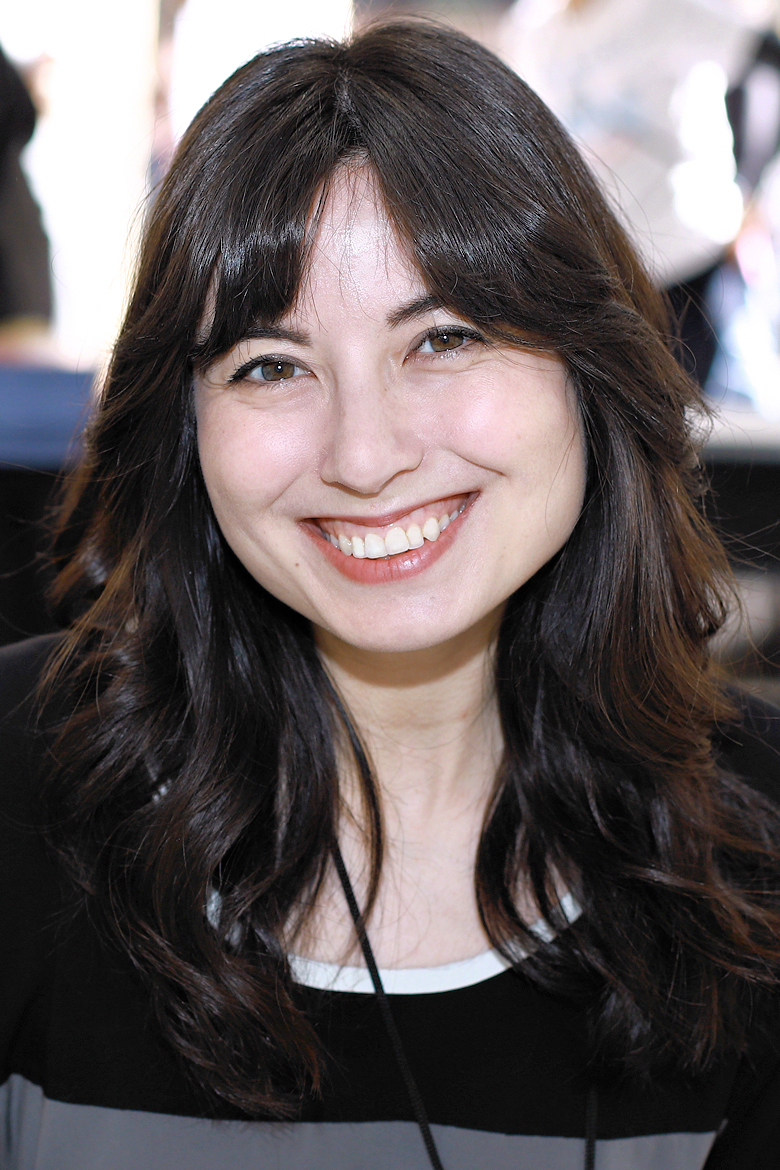
- Keller at the 2022 Texas Book Festival
- Born: 1993 (age 32–33); Honolulu, Hawaii
- Education: Punahou School; Bryn Mawr College
- Occupation: Author of children's books
- Relatives: Nora Okja Keller (mother)
- Writing career
- Notable work: When You Trap a Tiger
- Notable awards: Newbery Medal (2021)

Tae Keller is an American children's book author. Her second book, When You Trap a Tiger, won the 2021 Newbery Medal.

== Early life and education ==
Tae Keller was born in Honolulu, Hawaii in 1993. Her mother is award-winning author Nora Okja Keller. She graduated from Punahou School and from Bryn Mawr College.

== Career ==
Her second book, When You Trap a Tiger, won the 2021 Newbery Medal. The book tells the story of Lily and her relationship with her aging and ill Korean grandmother, and is inspired by Korean folktales. Keller is the youngest winner of the Newbery Medal.

Her fifth book, When Tomorrow Burns, was published by Random House in March 2026. The book was a finalist for the 2026 National Book Award for Young People's Literature.

== Awards and honors ==
When You Trap a Tiger was the 100th book to win the Newbery Medal, in 2021, was a 2020 Boston Globe–Horn Book Award honor and won the 2021 Asian/Pacific American Award for Children’s Literature.

== Publications ==
- The Science of Breakable Things (2018)
- When You Trap a Tiger (2020)
- Jennifer Chan is Not Alone (2022)
- Mihi Ever After (2022)
- When Tomorrow Burns. Random House. 2026. ISBN 9780593485583.
