= Igbo Americans =

Americans of Igbo birth or descent

Total population
- 226,000 (estimate)

Regions with significant populations
- Throughout the entire South (especially Maryland and Virginia) as well as the New York, Philadelphia, Missouri, California, Newark, New Jersey, Los Angeles, Miami, Boston, Chicago, Houston municipal areas, Albuquerque, New Mexico

Languages
- American English, African American Vernacular English, Igbo

Religion
- Odinani, Chiism, Christianity

Igbo Americans, (Igbo: Ṇ́dị́ Ígbò n'Emerịkà) are residents of the United States who identify as having Igbo ancestry from modern day Bight of Biafra, which includes Cameroon, Gabon, Equatorial Guinea, São Tomé and Príncipe & Nigeria. There are primarily two classes of people with Igbo ancestry in the United States, those whose ancestors were taken from Igboland as a result of the transatlantic slave trade before the 20th century and those who emigrated from the 20th century onwards partly as a result of the Nigerian Civil War in the late 1960s and economic instability in Nigeria. Igbo people prior to the American Civil War were brought to the United States by force from their hinterland homes on the Bight of Biafra and trafficked by Europeans to North America between the 17th and 19th centuries.

Identified Igbo slaves were often described by the ethnonyms Ibo and Ebo(e), a colonial American rendering of Igbo. Some Igbo slaves were also referred to as 'bites', denoting their Bight of Biafra origin, and other names were used in reference to their home lands in Africa. Their presence in the United States was met with mixed feelings by American plantation owners because of their 'rebellious' attitudes to enslavement. Many of the enslaved Igbo people in the United States were concentrated in Virginia's lower Tidewater region and at some points in the 18th century they constituted over 30% of the enslaved black population. Igbo culture contributed to the creolised African American culture and is perhaps evident in such cultural vestiges as the Jonkonnu parades of North Carolina. Igbo Americans introduced the Igbo word now anglicized as okra into the English language.

The recent migrant population from Nigeria settled in many of the United States' larger cities and urban centres and had come largely in search of economic opportunities in the late 20th century. Because of the realities of slavery and its erasure of African heritage and customs, most people who identify as Igbo in the United States and speak the Igbo language at home are from these families that arrived in the 20th century and forth.

== History ==
=== Atlantic slave trade ===
The Igbo were affected heavily by the Atlantic slave trade in the 18th century. Enslaved Igbo were known for being rebellious and having a high count of suicide in defiance of slavery. In the United States the Igbo were most numerous in the states of Maryland (coincidentally where there is a predominant population of recent Igbo immigrants) and Virginia, so much so that some historians have denominated colonial Virginia as “Igbo land.”

With a total of 37,000 Africans that arrived in Virginia from Calabar in the 18th century, 30,000 were Igbo according to Douglas B. Chambers. The Frontier Culture Museum of Virginia estimates around 38% of captives taken to Virginia were from the Bight of Biafra. Igbo peoples constituted the majority of enslaved Africans in Maryland. Chambers has been quoted saying "My research suggests that perhaps 60 percent of black Americans have at least one Igbo ancestor..."

=== Virginia ===
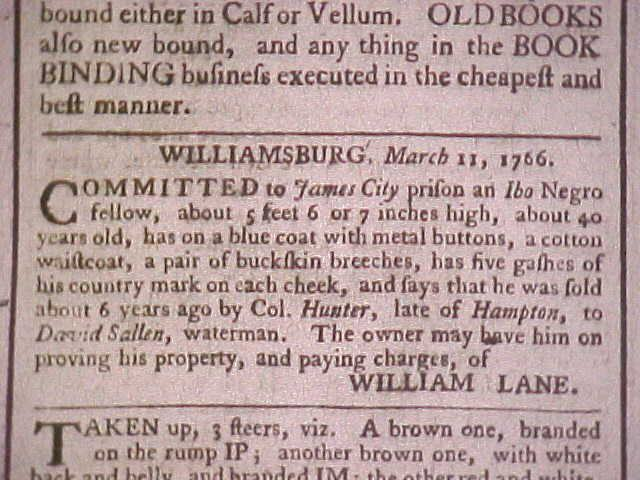
Slave notice from Williamsburg, Virginia for a runaway "Ibo Negro"

Virginia was the colony that took in the largest percentage of Igbo slaves. Researchers such as David Eltis estimate between 30 and 45% of the "imported" slaves were from the Bight of Biafra, of these slaves 80% were likely Igbo. A so-called conservative estimate of the amount of Igbo taken into Virginia between 1698 and 1778 is placed at 25,000. The Igbo concentration was especially high in the Tidewater and Piedmont regions of the Virginia interior. One of the reasons for this high number of Igbo slaves in Virginia was the domination of the Bight of Biafra region of Africa by Bristol and Liverpool English merchants who frequently brought Bight of Biafra slaves to British colonies, Virginia being one of these colonies. In addition, neighboring states further contributed to the concentration of Igbo slaves in Virginia. Planters in South Carolina and Georgia looked down on Igbo slaves because many were rebellious, selling the majority of Igbo slaves to Virginian planters as a result.

Some possible Igbo names were also found among slave records in Virginia. Names found in records such as Anica, or Anakey, Breechy and Juba may originate respectively from the Igbo names Nneka, meaning the mother is superior, and mburichi, male members of the Kingdom of Nri and Jiugba, meaning yam barn. Some had their ethnicity added to their names such as Eboe Sarah and plain Ebo. These hints of Igbo influence go along with cultural remnants pointing towards the Igbo presence in Virginia, one of which is the use of the Eboe drum in music. The Igbo presence in Virginia also brought new practices such as the cultivation of okra, a plant whose name derives from the Igbo language. Slaves in Virginia relied on sweet potato which is argued by Douglas Chambers to be an indication of a substitute for yam, the Igbo staple crop.

=== Kentucky ===
The state of Kentucky, which was carved out of the Colony of Virginia had received many of Virginia's slave drivers and slaves as people started migrating westward. These migrations spread out the population of African slaves in America, including Igbo slaves. Here the Igbo population had already become heavily creoleized alongside other African ethnicities that were taken in significant numbers to America.

== Culture ==
African cultures were heavily suppressed in the United States. The plantation and slave owners made sure to suppress African cultures through intimidation and torture, stripping away slaves' names and heritage. As expected, Igbo culture faced the same oppression, however some cultural remnants of Igbo origin was found and can still be found in the United States. Most of these cultural remnants can be found in music and entertainment. Igbo culture manifested in America through the Jonkonnu festivals that once took residence in the black slave population in Virginia. This masquerade bears similarity with the masking traditions of the Okonko secret society who still operate in the Igbo hinterland. The maskers wear horns which further shows similarity to Igbo culture and the Ikenga deity. Heavily African influenced American music genres such as jazz and ragtime stem from a mix of African cultures that creolized in the Americas. Although these genres could be described as a mix, there are elements of American music that have specific origin and Igbo instruments, such as the 'Eboe Drum'. The Igbo opi flute is similar to the drum and fife traditions.

The novel Things Fall Apart by Chinua Achebe follows the story of Okonkwo, an Igbo leader and warrior. The novel alludes to many of the customs and historical happenings of post-colonial Igbo culture. The book has been critically acclaimed, often being referenced as the archetypal African novel written for the Western world.

== Religion ==
The vast majority of Igbo Americans identify as Christian, with a significant amount of adherents to Roman Catholicism. Protestantism, including Anglicanism, Seventh day Adventist, Baptist, Methodist and non-denominational churches, make up the other denominations of Igbo Christians.

== Igbo landmarks in America ==
The language spread of Kru, Igbo and Yoruba in the United States according to U. S. Census 2000.

=== Igbo village in Virginia ===
The Frontier Culture Museum of Virginia has completed an Igbo single-family farmers compound to acknowledge the prevalence of the Igbo in 19th century Virginia.

=== Igbo Landing ===
Igbo Landing is a historic site in Dunbar Creek of St. Simons Island, Glynn County, Georgia, United States. In 1803, it was the location of a mass suicide by Igbo slaves in resistance to slavery in the United States, and is of symbolic importance in African American folklore and literary history.

== Notable people ==
- Nwando Achebe
- Chika
- Chinonye Chukwu
- Emmanuel Acho
- E. J. Nduka
- Annette Echikunwoke
- Michael Okwu
- Nnamdi Obukwelu
- Kezie Okpala
- Isaac Okoro
- Moose (wrestler)
- Ifeoma Onumonu
- Nneka Ogwumike
- Emma Nyra
- Giannis Antetokounmpo
- Thanasis Antetokounmpo
- Annie Ilonzeh
- Shaboozey
- Jonathan Mogbo
- Sam Acho
- Sonny Digital
- Ahamefule J. Oluo
- Ego Nwodim
- David Oyelowo
- Kristine Anigwe
- Josh Uche
- Akuoma Omeoga
- Ros Gold-Onwude
- Ngozi Onwumere
- Uzo Aduba
- Onyeka Okongwu
- Olaudah Equiano
- Emmit McHenry
- William E. Ward
- Chuma Okeke
- Chituru Odunze
- Michaela Onyenwere
- Romeo Okwara
- Julian Okwara
- Nimay Ndolo
- Kennedy Nzechukwu
- Tracy Ifeachor
- Ike Ibeabuchi
- Albert Okwuegbunam
- Chiney Ogwumike
- Kimberly Anyadike
- Nnamdi Asomugha
- Chukwu octuplets
- Michael Onwenu
- Ezinne Kalu
- Jeff Okudah
- Ike Diogu
- Megalyn Echikunwoke
- Philip Emeagwali
- Emeka Egbuka
- IK Enemkpali
- Justin Madubuike
- Erica Ogwumike
- Okwui Enwezor
- Emmanuel Chukwudi Eze
- Fat Tony (rapper)
- Godfrey (comedian)
- Germain Ifedi
- Chioma Igwe
- Uzodinma Iweala
- Bobby Iwuchukwu
- Brian Iwuh
- Nick Emmanwori
- Jesse Iwuji
- Jidenna
- Julie Iromuanya
- Obi Melifonwu
- Cristian Morton
- Nnamdi Moweta
- Chinedum Ndukwe
- Donovan Ezeiruaku
- Ikechuku Ndukwe
- Anthony Njokuani
- Ogonna Nnamani
- David Nwaba
- Uzoma Nwachukwu
- Ike Nwamu
- Uche Nwaneri
- Tobe Nwigwe
- Amarachi Nwosu
- Chimere Dike
- Mendi & Keith Obadike
- Leslye Obiora
- Cyril Obiozor
- Chris Ogbonnaya
- Cedric Ogbuehi
- Chiney Ogwumike
- Nneka Ogwumike
- KC Ohaebosim
- Alex Okafor
- Emeka Okafor
- Jahlil Okafor
- Joe Okafor
- Chike Okeafor
- Nnedi Okorafor
- Amobi Okoye
- Nkeiru Okoye
- Bennet Omalu
- Holmes Onwukaife
- Tochi Onyebuchi
- Oguchi Onyewu
- Brian Orakpo
- Yvonne Orji
- Kelechi Osemele
- Cheta Ozougwu
- Sonny Digital
- Chioma Ubogagu
- Valerian Ume-Ezeoke
- Michael Uzowuru
- Tyler, the Creator
- John Amaechi
- Ahamefule J. Oluo
- Ijeoma Oluo

== See also ==
- History of Nigerian Americans in Dallas–Fort Worth
- African diaspora
- African Americans
- Afro-Puerto Rican
- Nigerian Americans
- Igbo people
- Igbo Jamaican
- Things Fall Apart
- Yoruba Americans
