= Igbo people in Jamaica =

Jamaicans of Igbo heritage

Igbo people in Jamaica Eboe
Total population
- N/A

Languages
- English, Jamaican English, Jamaican Patois

Religion
- Christianity

Related ethnic groups
- Igbo people, Igbo Americans

Igbo people in Jamaica were trafficked by Europeans onto the island between the 18th and 19th centuries as enslaved labour on plantations. Igbo people constituted a large portion of the African population enslaved people in Jamaica. Jamaica received the largest number of enslaved people from the Bight of Biafra region than anywhere else in the diaspora during the slave trade. Some slave censuses detailed the large number of enslaved Igbo people on various plantations throughout the island on different dates throughout the 18th century. Their presence was a large part in forming Jamaican culture, Igbo cultural influence remains in language, dance, music, folklore, cuisine, religion and mannerisms. In Jamaica the Igbo were often referred to as Eboe or Ibo. There are a substantial number of Igbo language loanwords in Jamaican Patois. Igbo people mostly populated the northwestern section of the island.

== History ==
Originating primarily from what was known as the Bight of Biafra on the West African coast, Igbo people were trafficked in relatively high numbers to Jamaica as a result of the Transatlantic Slave Trade, beginning around 1750. The primary ports from which the majority of these enslaved people were taken from were Bonny and Calabar, two port towns that are now in south-eastern Nigeria. The slave ships arriving from Bristol and Liverpool trafficked enslaved people to the British colonies including Jamaica. The bulk of enslaved Igbo people arrived relatively late, between 1790 and 1807, when the British passed the Abolition of the Slave Trade Act which outlawed the slave trade in the British Empire. Igbo people were spread on plantations on the island's northwestern side, specifically the areas around Montego Bay and St. Ann's Bay, and consequently, their influence was concentrated there. The region also witnessed a number of revolts that were attributed to people of Igbo origin. Slave owner Matthew Lewis spent time in Jamaica between 1815 and 1817 and studied the way enslaved people he claimed ownership of organised themselves by ethnicity and he noted, for example, that at one time when he "went down to the negro-houses to hear the whole body of Eboes lodge a complaint against one of the book-keepers".

Olaudah Equiano, a prominent member of the movement for the abolition of the slave trade, was an African-born Igbo formerly enslaved person. On one of his journeys to the Americas as a free man, as documented in his 1789 journal, Equiano was hired by Dr. Charles Irving to recruit enslaved people for his 1776 Mosquito Shore scheme in Jamaica, for which Equiano hired enslaved Igbo, whom he called "My own countrymen". Equiano was especially useful to Irving for his knowledge of the Igbo language, using Equiano as a tool to maintain social order among his enslaved Igbo in Jamaica.

Enslaved Igbo were known, many a times, to have resorted to resistance rather than revolt and maintained "unwritten rules of the plantation" of which the plantation owners were forced to abide by. Igbo culture influenced Jamaican spirituality with the introduction of Obeah folk magic; accounts of enslaved "Eboe" being "obeahed" by each other have been documented by plantation owners. However, there is some suggestion that the word "Obeah" was also used by enslaved Akan people, before Igbos arrived in Jamaica. Other Igbo cultural influences include the Jonkonnu festivals, Igbo words such as "unu", "una", idioms, and proverbs in Jamaican patois. In Maroon music were songs derived from specific African ethnic groups, among these were songs called "Ibo" that had a distinct style. Igbo people were hardly reported to have been Maroons.

Enslaved Igbo people were known to have committed mass suicides, not only for rebellion, but in the belief their spirits will return to their motherland. In a publication of a 1791 issue of Massachusetts Magazine, an anti-slavery poem was published called Monimba, which depicted a fictional pregnant enslaved Igbo woman who committed suicide on a slave ship bound for Jamaica. The poem is an example of the stereotype of enslaved Igbo people in the Americas. Enslaved Igbo were also distinguished physically by a prevalence of "yellowish" skin tones prompting the colloquialisms "red eboe" used to describe people with light skin tones and African features. Enslaved Igbo women were paired with enslaved Coromantee (Akan) men by slave owners so as to subdue the latter due to the belief that Igbo women were bound to their first-born sons' birthplace.

Archibald Monteith, whose birth name was Aniaso, was an enslaved Igbo man taken to Jamaica after being tricked by an African slave trader. Anaeso wrote a journal about his life, from when he was kidnapped from Igboland to when he became a Christian convert.

After the abolition of slavery in Jamaica in the 1830s, Igbo people also arrived on the island as indentured servants between the years of 1840 and 1864 along with a majority Kongo and "Nago" (Yoruba) people. Since the 19th century most of the population African Jamaicans had assimilated into the wider Jamaican society.

=== Rebellions and uprisings of enslaved people ===
Enslaved Igbo people, along with "Angolas" and "Congoes" were often runaways, liberating themselves from enslavement. In slave runaway advertisements held in Jamaica workhouses in 1803 out of 1046 Africans recorded, 284 were described as "Eboes and Mocoes", 185 "Congoes", 259 "Angolas", 101 "Mandingoes", 70 Coromantees, 60 "Chamba" of Sierra Leone, 57 "Nagoes and Pawpaws" and 30 "scattering". 187 were documentined as "unclassified" and 488 were "American born negroes and mulattoes".

Some notable rebellions of enslaved people involving Igbo include:

- The 1815 Igbo conspiracy in Jamaica's Saint Elizabeth Parish, which involved around 250 enslaved Igbo people, described as one of the revolts that contributed to a climate for abolition. A letter by the Governor of Manchester Parish to Bathurst on April 13, 1816, quoted the leaders of the rebellion on trial as saying "that 'he had all the Eboes in his hand', meaning to insinuate that all the Negroes from that Country were under his control. The plot was thwarted and several enslaved people were executed.
- The 1816 Black River rebellion plot, was according to Lewis (1834:227—28), carried out by only people of "Eboe" origin. This plot was uncovered on March 22, 1816, by a novelist and absentee planter named Matthew Gregory "Monk" Lewis. Lewis recorded what Hayward (1985) called a proto-Calypso revolutionary hymn, sung by a group of enslaved Igbo, led by the "King of the Eboes". They sang:
  Oh me Good friend, Mr. Wilberforce, make we free!
  God Almighty thank ye! God Almighty thank ye!
  God Almighty, make we free!
  Buckra in this country no make we free:
  What Negro for to do? What Negro for to do?
  Take force by force! Take force by force!

"Mr. Wilberforce" was in reference to William Wilberforce a British politician who was a leader of the movement to abolish the slave trade. "Buckra" was a term introduced by enslaved Igbo and Efik people in Jamaica to refer to white slave owners and overseers.

== Culture ==
Not only enslaved Igbos were notoriously suicidal and were also prone to committing infanticide. According to slavevoyages.org, despite the archive also stating that Bight of Biafra disembarkations at 31.9% to Jamaica were the most, marginally over Gold Coast disembarkations by 29.5%. Igbo(bight of biafra) disembarkation were mostly in colonial Jamaica's international ports of Kingston and Montego Bay. and going with a known fact that Jamaican slave owners didn't speak to favorably of them, they were more than likely sold off to the Americas and Cuba (who favored them more and their own Nsibidi scripts can be known among the people and not amongst Jamaicans) from Montego Bay and to South America from Kingston. Which shows in the lacking of their culture in today's Jamaica. According to authors alive and took part in the sale of Africans in Jamaica, W.J. Gardner. No credence should be given towards the following, as Igbo culture had ceased to exist in Jamaica since the early 1800s.

Among Igbo cultural items in Jamaica were the Eboe, or Ibo drums popular throughout all of Jamaican music. Food was also influenced, for example the Igbo word "mba" meaning "yam root" was used to describe a type of yam in Jamaica called "himba". Enslaved Igbo and Akan people affected drinking culture among the Black population in Jamaica, using alcohol in ritual and libation. In Igboland as well as on the Gold Coast, palm wine was used on these occasions and had to be substituted by rum in Jamaica because of the absence of palm wine. Jonkonnu, a parade that is held in many West Indian nations, has been attributed to the Njoku Ji "yam-spirit cult", Okonko and Ekpe of the Igbo. Several masquerades of the Kalabari and Igbo have similar appearance to those of Jonkonnu masquerades. John Canoe was an Ahanta -Akan general that lived around 1708 to 1720, making it impossible for the Jamaican Christmas week celebration to be of Igbo origin. Edward Long in his life time had stated that Akan culture surpassed all other African ones due to the people being of Akan descent mostly.

=== Language ===
Much of Jamaican mannerisms and gestures themselves have a wider African origin, rather than specific Igbo origin. Some examples are non-verbal actions such as "sucking-teeth" known in Igbo as "ima osu" or "imu oso" and "cutting-eye" known in Igbo as "iro anya", and other non-verbal communications by eye movements.

There are a few Igbo words in Jamaican Patois that resulted when enslaved people were restricted from speaking their own languages. These Igbo words still exist in Jamaican vernacular, including words such as "unu" meaning "you (plural)", "di" meaning "to be (in state of)", which became "de", and "Okwuru" "Okra" a vegetable.

Some words of Igbo origin are

- "akara", from "àkàrà", type of food, a loanword from Yoruba
- "attoo", from "átú" meaning "chewing stick".

Idiom such as, via Gullah "big eye" from Igbo "anya ukwu" meaning "greedy";

- "breechee" from "mbùríchì", an Nri-Igbo nobleman;
- "de", from "dị" [with adverbial] "is" (to be);
- "obeah" from "ọbiạ" meaning "doctoring""mysticism";
- "okra" from "ọkwurụ", a vegetable;
- "poto-poto" from "opoto-opoto",
- "mkpọtọ-mkpọtọ" meaning "mud" or "muddy", also from Akan;
- "Ibo","Eboe", from "Ị̀gbò",
- "se", from "sị", "quote follows", also from Akan "se" and English "say";
- "soso", from sọsọ "only";"
- unu" or "una" from "únù" meaning "you (plural)"

=== Proverbs ===
"Ilu" in Igbo means proverbs, a part of language that is very important to the Igbo. Igbo proverbs crossed the Atlantic along with the masses of enslaved Igbo people. Several translated Igbo proverbs survive in Jamaica today because of the Igbo ancestors. Some of these include:

- Igbo: "He who will swallow udala seeds must consider the size of his anus"

Jamaican: "Cow must know 'ow 'im bottom stay before 'im swallow abbe [Twi 'palm nut'] seed"; "Jonkro must know what 'im a do before 'im swallow abbe seed."

- Igbo: "Where are the young suckers that will grow when the old banana tree dies?"

Jamaican "When plantain wan' dead, it shoot [sends out new suckers]."

- Igbo: "A man who makes trouble for other is also making one for himself."

Jamaican: "When you dig a hole/ditch for one, dig two."

- Igbo: "The fly who has no one to advise it follows the corpse into the ground."

Jamaican: "Sweet-mout' fly follow coffin go a hole"; "Idle donkey follow cane-bump [the cart with cane cuttings] go a [animal] pound"; "Idle donkey follow crap-crap [food scraps] till dem go a pound [waste dump]."

- Igbo: "The sleep that lasts for one market day to another has become death."

Jamaican: "Take sleep mark death [Sleep is foreshadowing of death]."

== Religion ==
"Obeah" refers to spiritual folk practices that were derived from West African sources. The W. E. B. Du Bois Institute database supports obeah being traced to the "dibia" or "obia" meaning "doctoring" traditions of the Igbo people. Specialists in "Obia" (also spelled Obea) were known as "Dibia" (doctor, psychic) practiced similarly as the obeah men and women of the Caribbean, like predicting the future and manufacturing charms. However, no Jamaica sees Obeah as medicinal, but rather as witchcraft and spells of black magic. This has less to do with European propaganda and more to do with tradition. In Jamaican mythology, "River Mumma", a mermaid, is linked to "Oya" of the Yoruba and "Uhamiri/Idemili" of the Igbo.

This isn't definite proof of anything due to the fact that there are many other mermaid spirits in west Africa. But what are Jamaican perspectives of River Mumma or River Maiden? River Maiden, the older name, is from the Twi word Nsuo(river) Ba(child/virgin/maiden), which is a direct translation of River Maid. In Jamaica, these are ugly fish monsters that kills if not appeased and not a goddess or even a single entity. But we will say 'her' in the case of River Maid. Her main centre of attack is at the St. Catherine parish's Flat Bridge, where her main altar is located on the Rio Cobre. There are no idols of deities in traditional Jamaican worship on shrines, very similar to the Akan shrines, where only the humanoid idols are borrowed deities. River Maid's shrine is only a heavily decorated pool of water from her river, which is a replica of a sink hole found in rivers, River Maids live in sinkholes and Mother Women are the only people who can catch the spirit and contain it. Jamaican's offer to this monster only to appease it and prevent it from causing accidents near her rivers. It is feared as one that drowns those who swim in her rivers or eat her fish. This is also how Akans describe their Tano and Nsuo Ba spirits, both associated with drownings and accidents near their rivers. One particular Asante Nsuo Ba known as Nsuo Abena from Juaben is remarkably similar to River Maid.

Among Igbo beliefs in Jamaica was the idea of Africans being able to go back home to Africa. There were reports by Europeans who visited and lived in Jamaica that enslaved Igbo believed they would return to their country after death.However, this is also Bakongo and Akan and not only an Igbo custom. But for Jamaica, who have a 9 night wake, the same as Akan who also traditionally have a 9 night wake called Dabone(or bad days). Both Jamaicans and Akans believe that death takes a 9 nights journey to return to their ancestral homeland in Africa. Each African tribe with their own set of customs and days.

== Notable Jamaicans of Igbo descent ==
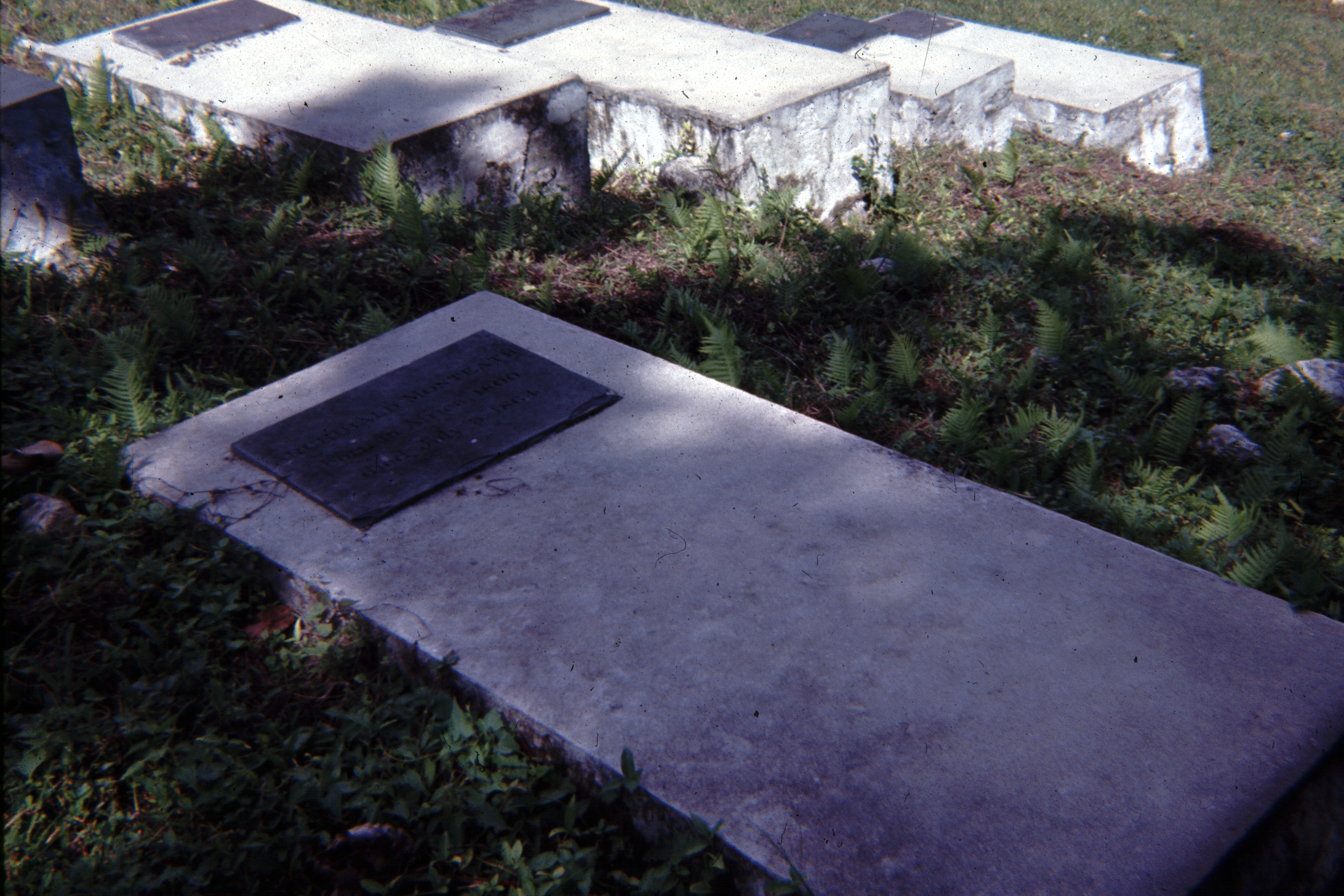
Archibald Monteith's grave. He was an Igbo known as Aniaso and was trafficked to Jamaica for enslavement.

- Archibald Monteith, a formerly enslaved person who was called "Aniaso," meaning "The earth spirit forbids" or "What the earth spirit forbids" was born in Igboland, and trafficked to Jamaica. He later orated an autobiography that was penned down by various transcribers. It details some of his childhood in the Igbo hinterland, his kidnapping, his journey to the West Indies, and his later life, both during enslavement and after his manumission.
- One of Malcolm Gladwell's European ancestors had a child by an enslaved Igbo woman, which started off the biracial Ford family on Gladwell's mother's side.
- Buju Banton

== See also ==
- Jamaicans of African ancestry
- Redbone (ethnicity)

== Bibliography ==
- McWhorter, John H. (2000). The Missing Spanish Creoles: Recovering the Birth of Plantation Contact Languages. University of California Press. ISBN 0-520-21999-6.
- Graddol, David; Leith, Dick; Swann, Joan (1996). English: history, diversity, and change. Routledge. ISBN 0-415-13117-0.
- Bartens, Ángela (2003). A contrastive grammar: Islander - Caribbean Standard English - Spanish. Finnish Academy of Science and Letters. ISBN 951-41-0940-6.
- Cassidy, Frederic Gomes; Le Page, Robert Brock (2002). A Dictionary of Jamaican English (2nd ed.). University of the West Indies Press. ISBN 976-640-127-6.
- Menz, Jessica (2008). London Jamaican-Jamaican Creole in London. GRIN Verlag. ISBN 978-3-638-94849-4.
- Holloway, Joseph E. (2005). Africanisms in American culture. Indiana University Press. ISBN 0-253-21749-0.
- Rickford, John R.; Romaine, Suzanne; Sato, Charlene J. (1999). Creole genesis, attitudes and discourse: studies celebrating Charlene J. Sato. John Benjamins Publishing Company. ISBN 90-272-5242-4.
- Warner Lewis, Maureen (1996). African continuities in the linguistic heritage of Jamaica. African Caribbean Institute of Jamaica.
- Eltis, David; Richardson, David (1997). Routes to slavery: direction, ethnicity, and mortality in the transatlantic slave trade. Routledge. ISBN 0-7146-4820-5.
- Huber, Magnus; Parkvall, Mikael (1999). Spreading the word: the issue of diffusion among the Atlantic Creoles. University of Westminster Press. ISBN 1-85919-093-6.
