= Oluo =

Oluo is a surname. Notable people with the surname include:

- Ahamefule J. Oluo, American musician, composer, comedian, and writer
- Ijeoma Oluo (born 1980), American author

== See also ==
- Olu
- Oluo Bozado, fictional character
