= Dialects of the Igbo language =

Regional varieties of Igbo and closely related Igboid speech forms

The dialects of the Igbo language are vatiations of Igbo language spoken in many regions across mostly southern Nigeria. Majority of the speakers can be found in Abia, Anambra, Ebonyi, Enugu and Imo states. Others are in Delta, Rivers and parts of Edo.

== See also ==
- Igbo language
- Igboid languages
- Standard Igbo
- Ika language (Nigeria)
- Enuani dialect
- Ngwa dialect
- Waawa
- Ikwerre language
- Ogba language
- Ekpeye language
- Igbo people
- Igboland
