= Lindy West =

American writer (born 1982)

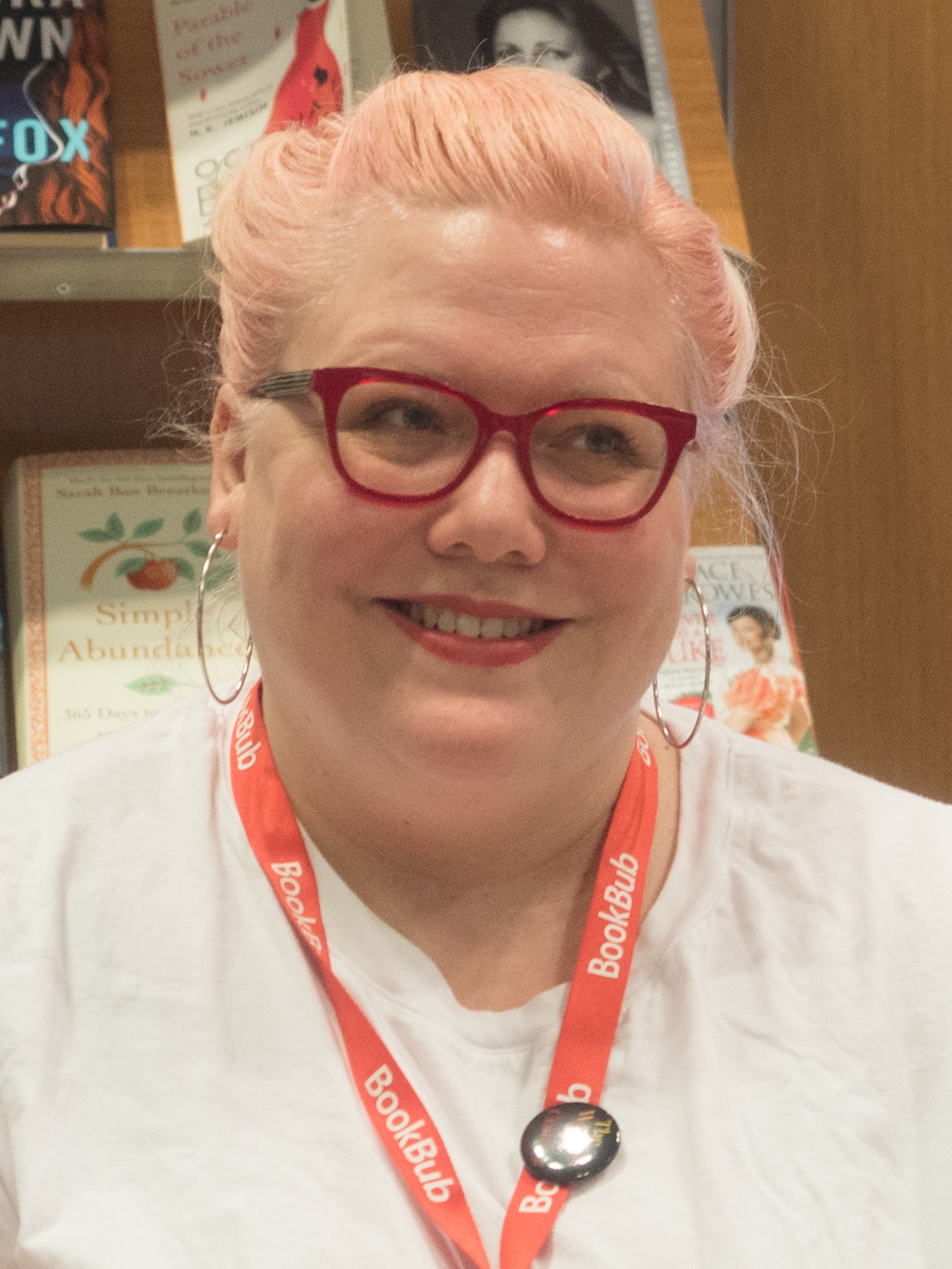
- West at BookCon, 2019
- Born: 1982 (age 43–44); Seattle, Washington, U.S.
- Education: Occidental College
- Occupations: Writer; comedian; activist
- Notable work: Shrill: Notes from a Loud Woman
- Spouse: Ahamefule J. Oluo (m. 2015)
- Partner: Roya Amirsoleymani (2021—present)
- Relatives: Ijeoma Oluo (sister-in-law); Gabriel Teodros (brother-in-law)
- Website: lindywest.net

Lindy West (born 1982) is an American writer, comedian, and activist. She is the author of several essay collections including Shrill: Notes from a Loud Woman, which was later adapted as a television series. West writes about topics of feminism, popular culture, film, the fat acceptance movement and more.

== Career ==
West worked as the film editor for Seattle's alternative weekly newspaper, The Stranger, from 2009 to 2012. In 2010, West's excoriating review of Sex and the City 2 went viral.

She was a staff writer for Jezebel where she wrote on racism, sexism, and fat shaming. West's work has been published in The Daily Telegraph, GQ, the New York Daily News, Vulture.com, Deadspin, Cracked.com, MSNBC and The Guardian. Describing West's often-comedic approach to serious issues, Dayna Tortorici wrote in The New York Times that West:

has changed more minds this way than you could count. One of the most distinctive voices advancing feminist politics through humor, West is behind a handful of popular pieces — "How to Make a Rape Joke" on Jezebel, "Hello, I Am Fat" on The Stranger's blog, "Ask Not for Whom the Bell Trolls; It Trolls for Thee" on "This American Life" — that have helped shift mainstream attitudes about body image, comedy and online harassment over the past several years. Culture molds who we are, West argues, but it's ours to remold in turn.

In 2013, West won the Women's Media Center Social Media Award, which was presented by Jane Fonda in New York City. Accepting the award, West said, "I hear a lot these days about the lazy, aimless 'millennials' – about how all we want to do is sit around twerking our iPods and Tweedling our Kardashians – and I also hear people asking, 'Where is the next generation of the social justice movement? Where are all the young feminists and womanists and activists?' Dude, they're on the internet."

Also in 2013, Kurt Metzger feuded with West and Jude Doyle via Facebook and Twitter during a defense of rape humor.

On September 19, 2015, West co-founded Shout Your Abortion, a social media campaign on Twitter where people share their abortion experiences online without "sadness, shame or regret" for the purpose of "destigmatization, normalization, and putting an end to shame". The social media campaign was initiated in response to efforts by the United States House of Representatives to defund Planned Parenthood following the Planned Parenthood 2015 undercover videos controversy.

From 2014 to 2017, West had a weekly column at The Guardian. West wrote opinion columns for The New York Times 2016 to 2019.

West's book Shrill: Notes from a Loud Woman was released in 2016. West has since published three additional books. The television adaptation of Shrill aired 2019 to 2021.

West and her husband Ahamefule Oluo cowrote a film Thin Skin, directed by Charles Mudede, that was released in 2023. West also premiered her one-woman show Every Castle, Ranked in 2023.

== Books and adaptations ==
In 2016, West won The Stranger's Genius Award in Literature for her book Shrill: Notes from a Loud Woman. On March 15, 2019, Shrill, the television series adaptation of West's memoir starring Aidy Bryant, premiered on Hulu. West was an executive producer and writer for the show, which ran for three seasons.

West's second essay collection, The Witches Are Coming, was published on November 5, 2019, by Hachette Book Group.

In October 2020, Hachette Books released West's book Shit, Actually: The Definitive, 100% Objective Guide to Modern Cinema.

West's fourth book Adult Braces: Driving Myself Sane, was released by Grand Central Publishing on March 10, 2026. In an opinion piece for The New York Times, Michelle Goldberg wrote of Adult Braces, "I interpreted West's book as a cautionary tale about female self-abnegation."

== Newsletter and podcast ==
West hosts a Substack newsletter called Butt News. West also has hosted a podcast called the Butt News Movie Club since 2023.

== Comedy show ==
In 2023, West premiered her one woman show Every Castle, Ranked. The production has West presenting a slideshow where she discusses "all the best and the worst castles" while using castles as a metaphor for the squandering of childhood potential.

== Personal life ==
Born in Seattle, Washington, in 1982, West is the daughter of Ingrid, a nurse, and Paul West, who was a musician. Her father died in 2011. She attended Occidental College in Los Angeles, California. In 2024, Occidental awarded West an honorary doctorate.

West shared that she had an abortion in 2010 while in a bad relationship.

On July 11, 2015, West married musician and writer Ahamefule J. Oluo, younger sibling of writer Ijeoma Oluo. They started dating in 2011 and briefly split later that year. West has two stepchildren.

West is bisexual and in 2022, West and Oluo revealed that they are polyamorous. West has defined their relationship as a "closed triad." West and Oluo have a shared partner, Roya Amirsoleymani. They share a cabin, previously owned by West's father, on Bainbridge Island.

== Bibliography ==
- How to Be a Person: The Stranger's Guide to College, Sex, Intoxicants, Tacos and Life Itself (2012)
- Shrill: Notes from a Loud Woman (2016)
- The Witches Are Coming (2019)
- Shit, Actually: The Definitive, 100% Objective Guide to Modern Cinema (2020)
- Adult Braces: Driving Myself Sane (2026)
