= Shrill (TV series) =

21st-century American comedy TV series

- Genre: Comedy
- Based on: Shrill: Notes from a Loud Woman by Lindy West
- Developed by: Aidy Bryant; Alexandra Rushfield; Lindy West
- Starring: Aidy Bryant; Lolly Adefope; Luka Jones; John Cameron Mitchell; Ian Owens; Patti Harrison
- Composers: Anna Waronker; Craig Wedren (seasons 1–2)
- Country of origin: United States
- Original language: English
- No. of seasons: 3
- No. of episodes: 22

Production
- Executive producers: Lorne Michaels; Andrew Singer; Aidy Bryant; Elizabeth Banks; Max Handelman; Lindy West; Ali Rushfield
- Producer: Dannah Shinder
- Running time: 21–30 minutes
- Production companies: Broadway Video; Brownstone Productions; Rushfield Productions; Warner Bros. Television

Original release
- Network: Hulu
- Release: March 15, 2019 – May 7, 2021

Shrill is an American comedy television series developed by Aidy Bryant, Alexandra Rushfield, and Lindy West, based on West's book Shrill: Notes from a Loud Woman. The series premiered on March 15, 2019, on Hulu, and stars Bryant in the lead role.

In April 2019, the series was renewed for a second season that premiered on January 24, 2020. In March 2020, the series was renewed for an eight episode third season, which was later confirmed to be the final season; it was released on May 7, 2021.

== Premise ==
Shrill follows "Annie, described as a fat young woman who wants to change her life — but not her body. Annie is trying to make it as a journalist while juggling bad boyfriends, sick parents, and a perfectionist boss, while the world around her deems her not good enough because of her weight. She starts to realize that she's as good as anyone else and acts on it."

== Cast and characters ==
=== Main ===
- Aidy Bryant as Annie Easton, the main character. Annie is a journalist at The Thorn, promoted from editing the calendar in the first episode, and in her late 20s. She is very intelligent and optimistic and aspires to do well, and always tries to solve the problems she faces in life.
- Lolly Adefope as Fran, Annie's best friend since college who was raised in the UK. They live together and own a dog together, Bonkers. Fran dates women. Her brother, Lamar, has had a crush on Annie for years. Alas, he lives in London.
- Luka Jones as Ryan, one of Annie's boyfriends. Ryan works at a hardware store and is rather lazy, although when he tries hard he can be intelligent. (seasons 1–2; recurring season 3)
- John Cameron Mitchell as Gabe Parrish, Annie's boss and the editor-in-chief of The Thorn and a former punk singer. At first he was portrayed as an antagonist and enemy to Annie in season 1; they have since come to better terms. He writes a memoir about his early life and the beginnings of The Thorn in the third season. Gabe has a husband.
- Ian Owens as Amadi, a close friend of Annie’s. Amadi works with Annie at The Thorn and is promoted to its director of human resources in the second season.
- Patti Harrison as Ruthie, the receptionist at The Thorn (season 2; recurring seasons 1 and 3).

=== Recurring ===
- Julia Sweeney as Vera Easton, Annie's mother. Vera is domineering and constantly tries to solve her daughter's problems herself, however later begins treating Annie like an adult. Vera is under a lot of stress due to her husband having cancer, so at times she lashes out at Annie, but does love her.
- Daniel Stern as Bill Easton, Annie's father. Bill is less controlling than Vera and is portrayed as bumbling and silly, he cares deeply for his daughter and wife and has a close relationship with Fran.
- Sean Tarjyoto as Angus, a reporter at The Thorn who is friends with Annie and Amadi.
- Scott Engdahl as Andy, an older reporter at The Thorn who admires Gabe, despite Gabe treating him like a genuine inconvenience. It is revealed in the second season episode "Skate" that he lives a double life as an EDM producer and DJ, going by the moniker "DJ Pussyhound."
- Dana Millican as Kim, a reporter at The Thorn (season 1)
- Jo Firestone as Maureen, a photographer at The Thorn who greatly admires Annie and becomes a closer friend to her as the show goes on.
- Conner O'Malley as Reggie, a distro guy at The Thorn.
- Tommy Snider as Mike, Ryan's younger brother and roommate (season 1; guest seasons 2 and 3)
- Michael Liu as Pete, Ryan's friend, former coworker, and roommate (season 1; guest season 2)
- Gary Richardson as "Calendar" Cody, the new calendar editor at The Thorn who is popular with the staff. (seasons 2-3)
- E. R. Fightmaster as Emily, or Em, Fran's romantic partner. They start dating at the end of season 2 due to confessing feelings for each other, however they begin to have relationship trouble when Fran doesn’t want to move in with them (seasons 2–3).
- Illeana Douglas as Sheila Branch, the publisher of The Thorn (seasons 2–3)
- Anthony Oberbeck as Nick Powell, an illustrator for The Thorn (season 3; guest season 2)
- Cameron Britton as Will Nolan, one of Annie's boyfriends who is also Amadi's best friend (season 3). Will is separated from his wife Mikayla who he has been dating since they were in high school.

=== Guests ===
- Joel Kim Booster as Tony, Gabe's husband who is a photographer (appearing once each season)
- Beck Bennett as Kevin, also known as "The Awesome," an Internet troll who gives Annie a hard time.
- Fred Armisen as Bongo, Gabe's friend and former bandmate who also started The Thorn with him (season 3)

== Episodes ==
Season	Episodes	Originally released
1	6	March 15, 2019
2	8	January 24, 2020
3	8	May 7, 2021

=== Season 1 (2019) ===
No. overall	No. in season	Title	Directed by	Written by	Original release date
1	1	"Annie"	Jesse Peretz	Teleplay by : Aidy Bryant & Alexandra Rushfield & Lindy West	March 15, 2019
Annie, the assistant calendar editor at a newspaper, is shot down by her boss Gabe when she asks to take on a real story. She goes to Ryan's house and, after sex, he asks her to leave out the back door so she will not run into his roommates. Later, she finds out she is pregnant, then learns the morning-after pill, which she relies on, does not work for women over 175 pounds. Her roommate Fran accompanies Annie to get an abortion. Afterward, Annie breaks up with Ryan, telling him she wants a boyfriend who will take her out in public. Newly empowered, she again pitches a story to Gabe, who rejects the idea but offers Annie the chance to write a restaurant review.
2	2	"Date"	Carrie Brownstein	Aidy Bryant & Alexandra Rushfield & Lindy West	March 15, 2019
Annie is assigned to write a restaurant review at a strip club and feels empowered by her conversation with the employees. Fran throws a party in honor of Annie's first "real assignment," but Gabe balks at the final product. Ryan tries to win Annie back by taking her on a date that goes bad. Annie talks to her mother about her mother's need to micromanage the people in her life. Annie spends the night at Ryan's, but she insists there be no sex. She meets Ryan's mother in the morning. Annie's review earns her respect in The Thorn newsroom, but it also gains her a troll. Fran loses another girlfriend.
3	3	"Pencil"	Andy DeYoung	Dave King	March 15, 2019
Fran's brother, Lamar, visits from London with gifts. Gabe throws a party to exhibit his boyfriend's art, and Annie invites Ryan to accompany her to the show for their "second date." At the party Annie asks Gabe for support to shut down her troll but he thinks it represents 'discourse'. Ryan forgets the party, and Annie is mocked by a colleague for having a 'fake boyfriend'. She leaves and goes to Ryan's where a party is happening. She discovers he is sleeping with other women. Devastated, she returns home, where Lamar confesses his crush on Annie and the two have sex. Lamar leaves the next day but leaves a cute post-it note.
4	4	"Pool"	Shaka King	Samantha Irby	March 15, 2019
In a flashback to Annie's younger years, her mother encourages her to join the family in the hotel pool, but Annie opts out. Fran establishes a "No Ryan" zone in the house. Annie pitches another story about an "inclusive" pool party for plus-size women that Gabe rejects, but Annie attends anyway with Fran. While Fran flirts with a new girlfriend, Annie loses track of time and misses the bike ride. Gabe humiliates her, insinuating her weight is holding her back from success. Infuriated, Annie posts an article entitled "Hello, I'm Fat" on The Thorn's website. In another flashback, Annie goes alone to the pool.
5	5	"Article"	Gillian Robespierre	Sudi Green	March 15, 2019
Annie's article goes viral, and Gabe is angry that she posted without his approval but pleased with the website traffic. Bonkers (Fran and Annie's dog) eats mushroom pills, and Annie asks Ryan to dog sit. Annie's visit to celebrate her father's positive cancer prognosis ends up in a family fight which sends her back home and into Ryan's arms while she ignores a commitment she made to Amadi.
6	6	"Troll"	Shaka King	Craig DiGregorio	March 15, 2019
Annie publishes another article that goes viral, and Gabe writes a rebuttal to Annie's "Hello, I'm Fat" article. After a public argument with him in The Thorn newsroom, she quits her job. Annie asks Amadi for help in hunting down her troll. Annie makes up with her mother, who later makes an unexpected exit. Annie confronts her troll, "The Awesome."

=== Season 2 (2020) ===
No. overall	No. in season	Title	Directed by	Written by	Original release date
7	1	"Camp"	Shaka King	Aidy Bryant	January 24, 2020
Annie goes camping with Ryan to escape the possible wrath of her troll. When they return, Annie learns that her mother has left town unexpectedly and Fran has been worried about Annie's safety. Annie announces her plans to become a freelance writer.
8	2	"Kevin"	Anna Dokoza	Rob Klein & Hye Yun Park	January 24, 2020
Annie's mother returns, but she is vague about why she went to Vancouver. Annie learns of Amadi's promotion when she returns to pick up her stuff at The Thorn offices. Emily tells Fran that Vic, her current girlfriend, is seeing other people. Annie interviews her troll for her first freelance article, but the blog post gets minimal attention. Fran is depressed, and Annie agrees to see Emily's cabaret performance to cheer Fran up.
9	3	"Skate"	Rebecca Asher	Tami Sagher	January 24, 2020
Annie's job search is going nowhere, but she overstates her prospects to her friends. Ruthie, the receptionist at The Thorn, hosts a 70s themed birthday party where Annie asks Gabe for her job back, and Ryan bonds with The Thorn's distribution guys. Ryan takes Annie home, where he tells her he loves her, and they agree to be "gross" together.
10	4	"Freak"	Ally Pankiw	Rob Klein & Clare O'Kane	January 24, 2020
Gabe assigns Annie to write The Thorn's "Freak of the Week." She meets Cody, the new calendar editor, who is very popular with the staff. Ryan meets Annie's parents in an awkward dinner. Fran takes herself out on a solo date.
11	5	"Wedding"	Shaka King	Solomon Georgio	January 24, 2020
Annie and Fran go on a road trip to Fran's cousin's wedding, where Fran faces her traditional Nigerian mother's expectations. Annie tells Lamar that she is now in a serious relationship, but they are later forced to share a bed for the night.
12	6	"WAHAM"	Natasha Lyonne	Sudi Green	January 24, 2020
Annie attends a women's empowerment conference where she meets the keynote speaker who, at first sight, appears to be an inspiration. She tries to have an honest conversation with her mother about her impromptu trip. Ryan gets a job at The Thorn, and Gabe mentors Annie.
13	7	"Salon"	Oz Rodriguez	Lindy West	January 24, 2020
Annie and Ryan have sex in the office. Gabe invites Annie to one of his exclusive salon gatherings. Fran plans a party in her own honor. Annie takes Ryan to the salon where he does not quite fit in, and she meets Nick, an illustrator, who introduces her to Sheila, The Thorn's publisher. Gabe seizes the spotlight at the salon, leaving Sheila unimpressed. Annie is "outed" for having sex at the office, and she tells Ryan to go home alone. Amadi learns about Ruthie's back story.
14	8	"HR"	Andrew DeYoung	Aidy Bryant & Alexandra Rushfield & Lindy West	January 24, 2020
Amadi holds sexual harassment training for The Thorn staff. Sheila invites Annie to lunch to gather input about management decisions, but Gabe shows up uninvited, and Annie is called away for her father's latest health emergency. Annie finally finds out why her mother left. Fran Fest is a hit, but Ryan crashes the party to give Annie some good news. Emily expresses her feelings for Fran. Annie makes a decision about her relationship with Ryan.

=== Season 3 (2021) ===
No. overall	No. in season	Title	Directed by	Written by	Original release date
15	1	"Ribs"	Carrie Brownstein	Lindy West	May 7, 2021
Annie goes on a date with a man who has his own insecurities. Amadi deals with business problems at The Thorn. Emily and Fran grow closer. Gabe sells his memoir. Annie and Nick start a flirtation. Fran deals with a problematic customer. Annie copes with a fatphobic doctor.
16	2	"Will"	Anu Valia	Sudi Green	May 7, 2021
Annie and Nick's flirtation continues. Emily urges Fran to consider working in a progressive salon. Amadi sets Annie up on a blind date with his best friend Will that suffers from awkwardness on both sides. Fran appears on TV.
17	3	"Retreat"	Carrie Brownstein	Sudi Green	May 7, 2021
The Thorn staff attends the annual "Brain Camp" retreat, which, due to budget cuts, is being held in the office. Gabe's book is published. Fran makes friends at the salon. Annie, Fran, Ruthie, and Maureen enjoy a girls' night out. Annie ends up at Nick's house.
18	4	"Ranchers"	Andrew DeYoung	Rob Klein	May 7, 2021
Annie visits the ranch of a group of white separatists for The Thorn. Emily and Fran try to make a porno. Annie cooks dinner for Nick, but when she tries to understand his mixed signals, he cannot be honest. Note: This episode marks the final in-person appearance of Bonkers the dog.
19	5	"No"	Anu Valia	Solomon Georgio	May 7, 2021
The reaction to Annie's article about white separatists sends her into a professional tailspin. Emily wants to know more about Fran's background, so Fran plans a cultural experience that eventually introduces Emily to Fran's mother. Annie gets some tough professional advice which drives her back to Ryan, who has moved on.
20	6	"Sorry"	Andrew DeYoung	Hye Yun Park & Clare O'Kane	May 7, 2021
Annie's assignment to write a profile about Gabe gives her a glimpse of The Thorn's history. At Amadi's birthday party, Annie and Will have a reckoning about their disastrous blind date. Fran and Emily's trip to Emily's childhood home reveals a family history that Fran is not expecting.
21	7	"Beach"	Andrew DeYoung	Aidy Bryant	May 7, 2021
Emily and Fran take a beach vacation with Will and Annie, who have been dating for a month but have not yet had sex. The episode flashes back to Annie and Fran's college years as Annie seeks to lose her virginity and Fran faces her authentic sexuality. Annie makes progress in warming up Will. Emily and Fran decide to move in together.
22	8	"Move"	Andrew DeYoung	Aidy Bryant & Alexandra Rushfield & Lindy West	May 7, 2021
Rumors abound about the future of The Thorn, so Annie writes a eulogy for the paper. Annie and Will FaceTime with Annie's parents, and Annie makes a surprising announcement. Fran has a change of heart about the progress of her relationship with Emily. When the fortunes of The Thorn take a positive turn, Annie and Amadi form a creative team with Gabe. When Annie ignores Will's request to take things slowly, the results are dire. Annie and Fran, alone again, decide they will need to change if they want their lives to open up for the future.

== Production ==
=== Development ===
On April 24, 2018, it was announced that Hulu was developing a television series adaptation of Lindy West's memoir Shrill: Notes from a Loud Woman with a pilot written by West, Ali Rushfield, and Saturday Night Live's Aidy Bryant. Executive producers were expected to include Lorne Michaels, Andrew Singer, Elizabeth Banks, and Max Handelman. Production companies involved with the series were set to consist of Broadway Video and Brownstone Productions.

On June 13, 2018, it was reported that Hulu had given the production a straight-to-series order. On August 1, 2018, the series order was confirmed and it was clarified that it was for a first season consisting of six episodes. It was further announced that the first episode of the series would be directed by Jesse Peretz and the second by Carrie Brownstein. Additionally, Rushfield and West were added as executive producers, Bryant as a co-executive producer, and Dannah Shinder as a producer.

While at the time West was understood to be a key producer, from her comments in her 2026 memoir, Adult Braces, it is clear she felt like the show was a departure from her personal experience. She wrote, "It’s not like if you watch Shrill, you won’t see me in there. I was writing scripts, attending castings, approving props, choosing background actors, interviewing post-production crew, getting hugged by the CEO of Warner Bros. Television...Shrill was never my show, and in the ways that matter to me, I was never really there. My real personality wasn’t in the room and didn’t often make it onto the screen."

On December 11, 2018, it was announced that the series would premiere on March 15, 2019. On April 15, 2019, the series was renewed for a second season that premiered on January 24, 2020. On March 31, 2020, the series was renewed for a third season. On January 27, 2021, Hulu announced that the third season would be the final season.

=== Casting ===
Alongside the initial development announcement, it was confirmed that Aidy Bryant would star in the production. Alongside the series order confirmation, it was announced that the series would co-star Lolly Adefope, Luka Jones, Ian Owens, and John Cameron Mitchell. On September 5, 2018, it was reported that Julia Sweeney had been cast in a starring role.

=== Filming ===
Principal photography for season one took place from the week of July 30, 2018, until the week of September 10, 2018, in Portland, Oregon. Season two began shooting in July 2019 until the week of September 7, 2019, again in Portland. Filming for season three started in October 2020, and ended on December 26, 2020, due to the ongoing COVID-19 pandemic. Coincidentally, it started shooting around the time Bryant returned for her ninth season on Saturday Night Live, so she took time off from SNL to film the season (she appeared in the first episode of the season, and appeared once in a pre-taped segment in the third episode, during the first half of the season).

== Release ==
The series held its world premiere during the 2019 South by Southwest film festival in Austin, Texas as a part of the festival's "Episodic Premieres" series of screenings.

== Reception ==
=== Critical response ===
On the review aggregator website Rotten Tomatoes, the first season holds an approval rating of 93% based on 54 reviews, with an average rating of 7.91/10. The website's critical consensus reads, "Sharp social commentary and a star-making performance from Aidy Bryant help Shrill overcome its familiar comedic sensibilities to create a show that proves self-acceptance isn't one size fits all." On Metacritic the first season has a score of 74 out of 100, based on reviews from 27 critics, indicating "generally favorable reviews".

Kelly Lawler from USA Today gave the series a positive review, calling it an "unflinchingly authentic depiction of a fat woman in the modern world" and acknowledging that it "flies past positivity and shoots for fat acceptance." Pop Culture Happy Hour's Linda Holmes, who is plus-sized, applauded the writers for giving the protagonist the best lines, instead of handing them off to secondary or supporting characters. Holmes writes: "seeing her perform such strong material is a delight".

The Washington Post gave the show a more negative review, writing, "Shrill is mostly just another show that wants to make fun while also making essentially unarguable points about modern manners." Robyn Bahr of The Hollywood Reporter criticized the series, opening with, "Warning: A fat woman has written this review" and later stating that the show is "not as sharp as it should be". She also criticized the show's writing, saying, "her relationships are too underdeveloped to emotionally invest in." Verne Gay from Newsday also criticized the series, writing, "Shrill too often feels more like that extended trope than fully developed series."

In June 2026, Shrill was added to Netflix for the first time following its exclusive stint on Hulu. Within a week, it ranked among the top five most watched shows.

=== Awards ===
Year	Award	Category	Nominee(s)	Result	Ref.
2020	Artios Awards	Television Pilot and First Season Comedy	Collin Daniel and Brett Greenstein	Nominated	
2020	NAACP Image Awards	Outstanding Directing in a Comedy Series	Shaka King (for "Pool")	Nominated	
2021	Primetime Emmy Awards	Outstanding Lead Actress in a Comedy Series	Aidy Bryant	Nominated	
2022	GLAAD Media Awards	Outstanding Comedy Series	Shrill	Nominated	
