= Shrill: Notes from a Loud Woman =

2016 book by Lindy West

- First edition
- Author: Lindy West
- Language: English
- Genre: non-fiction
- Publisher: Hachette Books
- Publication date: 2016
- Publication place: United States
- Media type: Hardcover, paperback, e‑book
- Pages: 272 pp
- ISBN: 978-0-316-34840-9 (Hardcover)

Shrill: Notes from a Loud Woman is a 2016 non-fiction book by American writer Lindy West. The book collects a series of humorous personal essays, with topics ranging from body image and rape threats to puberty and West's love for her husband. West published the 272-page collection with Hachette on May 17, 2016. Favorably reviewed, Shrill was optioned as a television series, which premiered on Hulu in March 2019, starring Aidy Bryant.

== Reception ==
Overall, Shrill received generally positive reviews. Writing for Slate, Nora Caplan-Bricker described West's writing as "both sharp-toothed and fluid as it rips into period stigma and abortion stigma, sexism and fat-shaming. Though the book's many shrewd insights sometimes feel strung together in a way that's less than artful, they are always a pleasure to read." In The Guardian, Annalisa Quinn praised the book, writing, "Shrill mixes humour with pathos so effectively that those qualities magnify each other rather than cancelling each other out. West has somehow stayed open and vulnerable in the face of constant attack, abuse that would turn a lot of people into a brittle shell, instead of a warm, capacious and funny writer."

Dayna Tortorici writing for The New York Times gave Shrill a mixed review, noting West's "wildly generous attitude toward her audience—meeting readers at their point of prejudice so that she may, with little visible effort, shepherd them toward a more humane point of view." However, Tortorici was less enthusiastic about the book's "at times ... juvenile" style of humor ("I dislike all caps in print, of which she is fond, because I am NO FUN," Tortorici says.) Generally, she said, "Shrill feels hasty and unfinished, less like a book than the assembled material required to consummate a book deal," but drew on West's public contributions that deserved the compensation.

== Television adaptation ==
In December 2016, Elizabeth Banks optioned Shrill for adaptation to television, ultimately going into development at Hulu. Lindy West, Ali Rushfield, and SNL's Aidy Bryant conceived of the series' premise. Bryant stars in the series as a character based partly on West. Executive producers include Elizabeth Banks, Lorne Michaels, Andrew Singer, and Max Handelman. Production companies involved with the series include Broadway Video and Brownstone Productions. The series premiered on March 15, 2019, on Hulu. The series final season, season 3, premiered on May 7, 2021, on Hulu.
