= So You Want to Talk About Race =

2018 non-fiction book by Ijeoma Oluo

- Front cover
- Author: Ijeoma Oluo
- Subject: Race and ethnicity in the United States
- Genre: Non-fiction
- Publisher: Seal Press
- Publication date: January 16, 2018
- Pages: 256 pp.
- ISBN: 9781580056786
- OCLC: 986970684
- LC Class: E184.A1 O454 2018

So You Want to Talk About Race is a 2018 non-fiction book by Ijeoma Oluo. Each chapter title is a question about race in contemporary America. Oluo outlines her opinions on the topics, as well as advice about how to talk about the issues. The book received positive critical reception, with renewed interest following the May 2020 murder of George Floyd, after which the book re-entered The New York Times Best Seller list.

== Background ==
Author Ijeoma Oluo was an editor-at-large at The Establishment. So You Want to Talk About Race is her first book. Oluo was persuaded to write a book by her agent, who conceived of a "guidebook" in which Oluo answered questions she regularly received on social media or addressed in her essays. Oluo was reluctant to spend so much time writing about race but was inspired, after beginning to ask people what issues they face, when talking about race, and hearing the responses of people of color.

The book was published by Seal Press.

== Synopsis ==
The book is about race in the contemporary United States, each chapter titled after a question. Oluo makes the argument that America's political, economic, and social systems are systematically/institutionally racist. The book provides advice for readers, when discussing race-related subjects, such as how to avoid acting defensive or getting off-topic. Statistics are used to support the book's arguments. Oluo also describes her upbringing and experience of living in Seattle, Washington. She was raised by a white single mother and became a single mother, herself, to two mixed-race sons, at a young age.

The book also covers topics including affirmative action, cultural appropriation, intersectionality, microaggressions, police brutality, and the school-to-prison pipeline. Oluo argues that use of the word "nigger" or other racial slurs by white people is not appropriate, even if the intention is ironic or the motive anti-racist.

== Reception ==
The book received renewed attention, following the murder of George Floyd, in May 2020. Having been listed for one week, previously, it re-entered The New York Times Best Seller list in the category Combined Print & E-book Nonfiction on June 14, 2020, peaking at position #2, on June 21. It remained on the list, until September 13, and it reappeared October 4.

=== Critical reception ===
Bustle named So You Want to Talk about Race to a list of 14 recommended debut books by women, praising Oluo's "no holds barred writing style", as well as to a list of the 16 best non-fiction books of January 2018. Harper's Bazaar also named it to a list of 10 best new books of 2018, saying "Oluo crafts a straightforward guidebook to the nuances of conversations surrounding race in America." The New York Times listed the book in its "New & Noteworthy" column.

Publishers Weekly praised Oluo's commentary as "thoughtful,” “insightful,” and "not preachy". Jenny Ferguson of the Washington Independent Review of Books found Oluo's style to be "intellectually sharp and even funny,” praising the "punchy one- and two-liners.” She thought that white readers would "gain insight" on the book and found that the book's tone and use of direct address made reading an "intimate experience". Salon's Erin Keane reviewed that the book is "accessible and approachable" and recommended it as "a highly productive book-in-common for high school seniors in America". Jenny Bhatt of The National Book Review wrote that the book is "a comprehensive conversation guide" with arguments presented "thoroughly and rationally.” Bhatt found "no ambivalence or soft-pedaling" in the book, praising Oluo for being "even-keeled,” when discussing her personal experiences.

Ferguson criticised the use of the term "Indigenous American" in the book as an example of "Oluo's own basic assumptions that create an inhospitable climate for other racially marked bodies.” Oluo responded that future editions of the book would, instead, use the term "indigenous peoples". Bhatt suggested that a further reading list would have improved the book.
