= Michael Okwu =

Nigerian American journalist

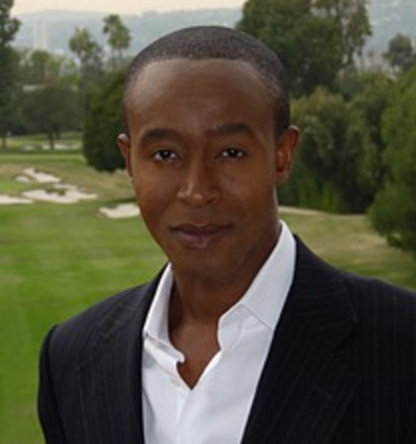
- Born: Michael Chiaka Douglass Okwu; Emekuku, Imo State, Nigeria
- Education: Harvard University (BA)
- Occupation: Journalist
- Spouse: Jeanette Okwu
- Children: 1

Michael Chiaka Douglass Okwu is a Nigerian American journalist, television personality, and media entrepreneur.

== Early life and education ==
Michael Okwu was born in Emekuku, Imo State in southeastern Nigeria. His father and mother, a diplomat and educator respectively raised Michael and his four brothers abroad in London, Washington, D.C., and Dar es Salaam before the family fled as refugees of the Biafran War and permanently re-settled in the United States. Okwu was schooled at St Aedan's Parochial School and Phillips Exeter Academy, and studied Government at Harvard University where he was an editor of the Crimson, a soccer player and a sprinter on the track team.

== Career ==
After graduating Okwu moved to New York to accept a paid internship on the CBS news magazine "West 57th". He was later hired by CNN where he worked as a production assistant, assignment editor, and field producer before becoming a correspondent and anchor. In 1998, he was assigned to work on CNN NewsStand, the network's prime time news magazine. He also hosted the entertainment unit's Showbiz Today reports, interviewing and profiling artists and celebrities, and later served as an anchor for Diplomatic License, a weekly world affairs program centered on the United Nations. He has reported live from Ground Zero following the attacks on 9/11, and covered the UN during the build up to the second Iraq war.

From 2004 to 2010 Okwu was a Los Angeles based correspondent for NBC News appearing regularly on Today, NBC Nightly News with Brian Williams and MSNBC. He also filed special reports for Dateline and long form segments for CNBC's Business Nation. He worked across North America, Europe, and Asia including the US Olympic track and field steroids scandal, Britain's 2005 royal wedding and parliamentary elections, the papal conclave following the death of Pope Paul II, the 2008 presidential election of Barack Obama, and the death of Michael Jackson.

In 2010, he moved on to host interview specials on public television in California and contributed long-form reports for So-Cal Connected. Episodes included profiles of local figures like jazz musician Herbie Hancock and chef Thomas Keller as well as reports on the rising black market for prescription drugs, the new age of eco-terrorism and animal rights extremism.

As a national correspondent and special host for America Tonight, Al Jazeera America's flagship news magazine show, Okwu travelled to towns in and around the exclusion zone in Fukushima for a series of reports about how the nuclear disaster changed life in Japan. He anchored special broadcasts about California's years long drought, a retrospective about the Watts riots, and an investigation on forced arbitration.

Okwu also serves as news anchor for Deutsche Welle's English-language bureau, DW News.

== Personal life ==
Michael Okwu is married to Jeanette Okwu a digital and social media marketer for Spark44. He is the father of one daughter.

== Awards ==
Okwu is the winner of three Emmys and Cable Ace Awards, five LA Press Awards, a National Headliner Award, and a features prize from the National Association of Black Journalists.
