= Ijeoma Oluo =

American writer (born 1980)

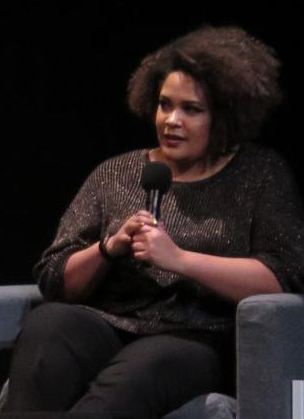
- Born: 1980 (age 45–46); Denton, Texas, US
- Other name: Ijeoma Jacobson
- Education: Bachelor of Arts (2007)
- Alma mater: Western Washington University
- Occupation: Writer
- Notable work: So You Want to Talk About Race
- Spouse: Gabriel Teodros (m. 2022)
- Children: 2
- Relatives: Ahamefule J. Oluo (brother); Lindy West (sister in-law)

Ijeoma Oluo (/iˈdʒoʊmə oʊˈluːoʊ/; born 1980) is an American writer. She is the author of So You Want to Talk About Race and has written for The Guardian, Jezebel, The Stranger, Medium, and The Establishment, where she was also an editor-at-large.

Born in Denton, Texas, and based in Seattle, Washington, in 2015, Oluo was named one of the most influential people in Seattle, and in 2018, she was named one of the 50 most influential women in Seattle. Her writing covers racism, misogynoir, intersectionality, online harassment, the Black Lives Matter movement, economics, parenting, feminism, and social justice.

She gained prominence for articles critiquing race and the invisibility of women's voices, like her April 2017 interview with Rachel Dolezal, published in The Stranger.

== Early life and education ==
Oluo was born in Denton, Texas, in 1980. Her father, Samuel Lucky Onwuzip Oluo, is from Nigeria, and her mother, Susan Jane Hawley, is from Kansas and is white. Oluo’s father moved back to Nigeria in her early childhood and died in 2006. Her younger sibling is jazz musician Ahamefule J. Oluo, who is married to Seattle writer Lindy West.

She graduated from Lynnwood High School in 1999 and received a Bachelor of Arts degree in political science from Western Washington University in 2007.

== Career ==
=== Early career ===
Oluo began her career in technology and digital marketing. She turned to writing in her mid-30s after the 2012 death of Trayvon Martin, who was the same age as her son, Malcolm, at the time. Fearful for her son as well as her younger brother, a musician then traveling on tour, Oluo began sharing long-held concerns via a blog she had previously devoted to food writing. She has described these initial forays as a significant influence on her writing style, as she hoped that sharing personal stories would be a way to connect to and activate her predominantly white community in Seattle. Oluo has said she was disappointed by the response she initially received, and that many of her existing friends "fell away" instead of engaging in the issues she had begun raising; however, many black women she hadn't previously known reached out to express appreciation and Oluo's profile as a writer grew, with publishers asking to reprint work from her blog and eventually commissioning new writing.

=== Journalism and commentary ===
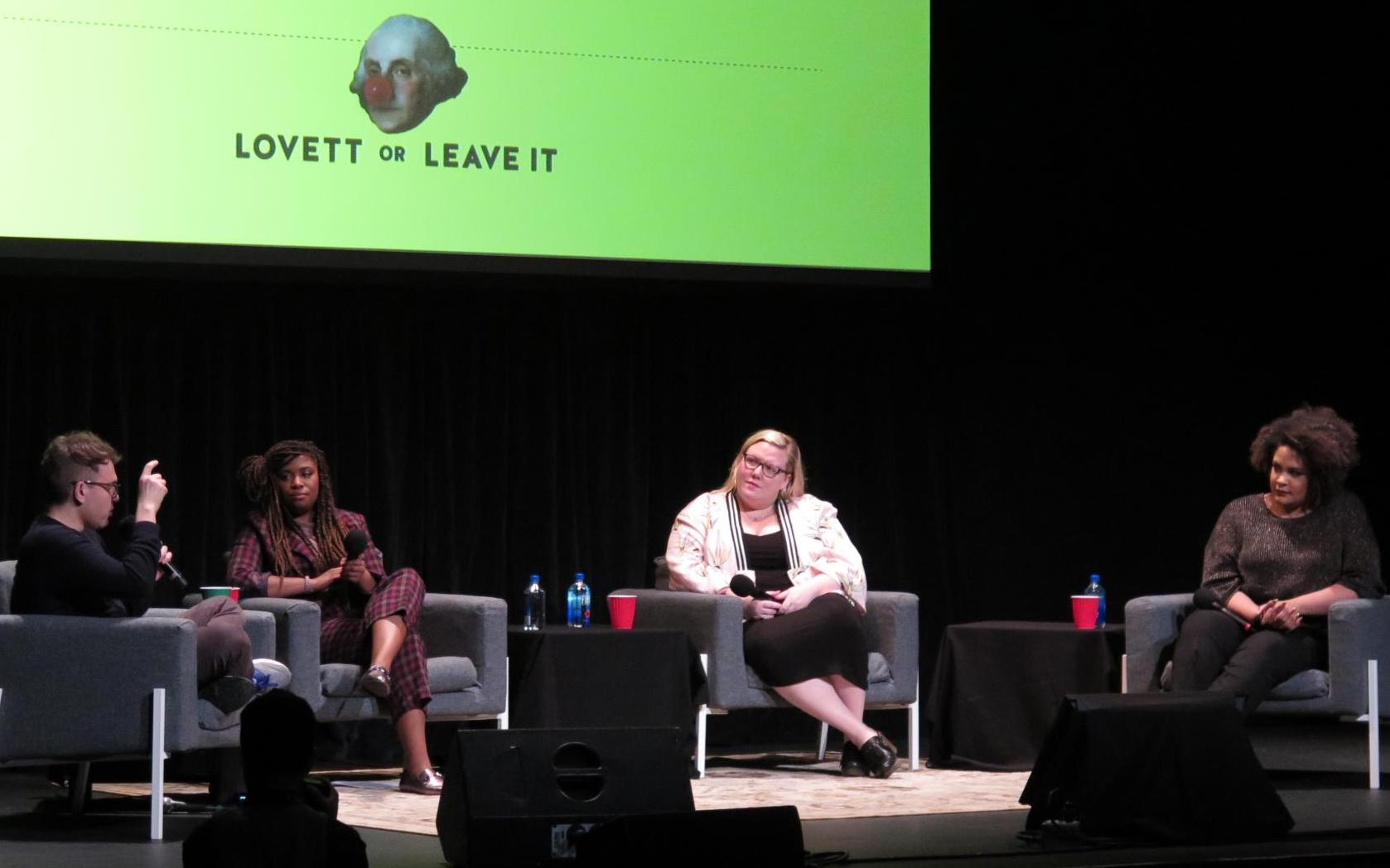
Recording the Lovett or Leave It podcast on January 27, 2018, at the Moore Theatre in Seattle. Hosted by Jon Lovett (left) and Akilah Hughes (second from left), with guests Lindy West (second from right) and Ijeoma Oluo (right).

Oluo's columns and news articles appeared in The Guardian and The Stranger newspapers from 2015 through 2017, and she has also written for Jezebel, Medium and The Establishment, a publication based at Medium that Oluo helped launch; she was an editor-at-large. Her writing covers topics like misogynoir, intersectionality, online harassment, the Black Lives Matter movement, race, economics, parenting, feminism and social justice.

She is known for critiques of race and the erasure of black women's voices in the United States, as exemplified in Oluo's April 2017 interview of Rachel Dolezal, published in The Stranger.

Oluo stopped writing for The Stranger in July 2017; her reasons included the paper's decision to publish an article on detransitioning that Oluo said was "written by a cis woman without the knowledge and language necessary to responsibly report on the subject in a way that would not feed into the narrative of anti-trans bigots. The piece quotes a doctor widely discredited for junk science, with a well-known anti-trans bias." Though Oluo has taken strong stands on many social issues, she has also said fans should be comfortable criticizing and speaking honestly about errors such as expressions of sexism, racism, or classism by their favorite celebrities, without having to condemn or reject anyone as irredeemable, and that critics generally share many of the same flaws they call out in others. She wrote in 2015 that, "Being anti-racist doesn't mean that you are never racist, it means that you recognize and battle racism in yourself as hard as you battle it in others." She expanded on this theme of honest dialogue about uncomfortable truths in her 2018 book, writing that "This does not mean that you have to flog yourself for all eternity."

Oluo wrote on her blog in November 2017 that USA Today had asked her to write an op-ed, but only on the condition that Oluo's article argue against the need for due process with regard to sexual misconduct allegations such as the high-profile cases associated with the Me Too movement. Specifically she said that the editors "want a piece that says that you don't believe in due process and that if a few innocent men lose their jobs it's worth it to protect women." Oluo was willing to rebut the USA Today editorial that the accused are at great risk of their rights to due process being violated, but said she would not play the role of "their strawman", since she did in fact believe in everyone's right to due process. After Oluo wrote about the USA Today offer, The Washington Post responded with an editorial by Christine Emba that shared Oluo's position that the greatest violations of due process had been against the rights of harassment victims who had been denied justice for many years, and that such protestations over due process were, in Oluo's words, "attempt to re-center the concerns of men". Oluo had said that such apparent concern for due process was intended to, "stop women from coming forward before too many men are held accountable for their actions".

==== Temporary Facebook suspension ====
Oluo's Facebook account was temporarily suspended in 2017. She had made a joke on Twitter that she felt uncomfortable around "white folk in cowboy hats" the first time she went in a Cracker Barrel. In response, she received hundreds of threats and racist messages on Twitter and to her Facebook account. Twitter took down tweets and banned users who were breaking its terms of service, but Oluo said Facebook did nothing for three days. Her account was suspended after Oluo posted screenshots of the messages, saying Facebook was not doing anything to help. Facebook later apologized and reactivated her account, saying the suspension had been a mistake. Oluo said the Facebook accounts of several other black activists have been suspended after publicly posting screenshots of threatening messages they had received, and each time Facebook said it was a mistake.

=== Books ===
==== The Badass Feminist Coloring Book ====
In 2015, Oluo self-published The Badass Feminist Coloring Book using Amazon's CreateSpace. The project began with Oluo sketching outlines of favorite feminists as a stress reliever; encouraged by friends, she launched a Kickstarter campaign to create a coloring book of 45 sketches and accompanying quotes. Well before the deadline, the project raised more than double its goal.

Feminists depicted in The Badass Feminist Coloring Book include Lindy West (Oluo's sister-in-law), comedian Hari Kondabolu, writer Feminista Jones and musician Kimya Dawson (of The Moldy Peaches).

==== So You Want to Talk About Race ====
Oluo's book So You Want to Talk about Race was published on January 16, 2018, by the Seal Press imprint of Perseus Books Group's Da Capo. In its "New & Noteworthy" column, The New York Times described the book as "tak[ing] on the thorniest questions surrounding race, from police brutality to who can use the 'N' word." Oluo began the project at the suggestion of her agent, who proposed Oluo write a guidebook to discussing the topics she was writing about regularly. Oluo was initially reluctant, feeling she already spent more time dealing with race than she wanted — speaking to Bitch magazine, she said, "Think about how much time you want to spend, as a Black woman, talking about race, and then dedicating a whole book to talking about race. It's tough for me." But as she considered the idea, she found many people reached out with topics, and ultimately she decided that a book might save her from having to answer the same questions over and over; in particular she hoped a book's tangible form might reach people in a different way than online work did.

Bustle named So You Want to Talk about Race to a list of 14 recommended debut books by women, praising Oluo's "no holds barred writing style", as well as to a list of the 16 best non-fiction books of January 2018. Harper's Bazaar also named it to a list of 10 best new books of 2018, saying "Oluo crafts a straightforward guidebook to the nuances of conversations surrounding race in America."

==== Mediocre: The Dangerous Legacy of White Male America ====
Mediocre: The Dangerous Legacy of White Male America, published December 1, 2020, by the Seal Press imprint of Basic Books, is a historical and contemporary analysis of how white male supremacy affects politics, the workplace, sports and daily life. It was included in recommended reading lists from Time, The Washington Post, and The Seattle Times and has a starred review at Publishers Weekly.

==== Be a Revolution: How Everyday People Are Fighting Oppression and Changing the World—and How You Can, Too ====
Be a Revolution: How Everyday People Are Fighting Oppression and Changing the World—and How You Can, Too, published January 30, 2024, by Harper Collins, is a collection of profiles and interviews of doers that "connect[ing] racial justice to the arts, disability, education, gender, and policing." It was included in reviews posted from Publishers Weekly. It was covered by ABC News Live and The Seattle Times. Bookforum announced HarperOne's purchase of the book and commented that it was an example of the phenomenon of BookTok's ability to drive book sales on March 22, 2021.

=== Other projects ===
Oluo has also performed as a speaker, storyteller and standup comic. Oluo was interviewed in the 2016 documentary short Oh, I Get It included in the Slamdance, Seattle Lesbian & Gay Film Festival, and others, about her experiences as a queer stand-up comedian.

== Awards and honors ==
Seattle Met named Oluo one of the 50 most influential women in Seattle in 2018, and Seattle Magazine named her one of the most influential people in Seattle in 2015, for her "incisive wit, remarkable humor and an appropriate magnitude of rage", and said she is "one of Seattle's strongest voices for social justice." Bustle included Oluo among "13 Authors to Watch in 2018".

Oluo received the Feminist Humanist Award in 2018 and Harvard Humanist of the Year Award in 2020, alongside Sikivu Hutchinson and Mandisa Thomas, from the American Humanist Association.

== Personal life ==
In 2022, Oluo married the hip-hop artist Gabriel Teodros. Oluo has two sons who were born around 2002 and 2008, and a grandchild born in 2025.

Oluo is an atheist and identifies as queer.

== Notable works ==
- —— (2024). Be a Revolution: How Everyday People Are Fighting Oppression and Changing the World — and How You Can, Too. Harper Collins. ISBN 978-0-063-14018-9.
- —— (2020). Mediocre: The Dangerous Legacy of White Male America. Seal Press. ISBN 978-1-58005-951-0.
- —— (2018). So You Want to Talk About Race. Da Capo Press. ISBN 978-1-58005-678-6. OCLC 986970684.
- —— (April 19, 2017). "The Heart of Whiteness: Ijeoma Oluo Interviews Rachel Dolezal, the White Woman Who Identifies as Black". The Stranger.
- —— (2015). The Badass Feminist Coloring Book. CreateSpace Independent Publishing Platform. ISBN 978-1-5172-6865-7. OCLC 941812206.

== See also ==
- Black feminism
- Black Twitter
- Say Her Name
- Womanism
