= Enuani dialect =

Igbo language dialect spoken in Nigeria

Enuani is a dialect of Igbo spoken primarily by the Enuani people, an ethnic group native to Delta North, particularly in the Oshimili and Aniocha regions of Delta State, Nigeria.
