= Ahamefule J. Oluo =

American musician, comedian, and writer

- Born: 1982 (age 43–44); Denton, Texas, U.S.
- Genres: Jazz
- Occupations: Trumpeter, musician, writer, comedian
- Instruments: Trumpet
- Spouse: Lindy West (m. 2015)
- Partner: Roya Amirsoleymani (2019—present)
- Website: nowimfine.com

Ahamefule J. Oluo is an American musician, trumpeter, composer, stand-up comedian, and writer. Oluo uses they/them and he/him pronouns. They were the first artist-in-residence at Town Hall Seattle.

== Career ==
As a trumpeter, Oluo has performed or recorded with numerous prominent musicians and groups, including Das Racist, John Zorn, Hey Marseilles, Wayne Horvitz, Macklemore, and Julian Priester. They are a member of jazz quartet Industrial Revelation, winner of a 2014 Stranger Genius Award. The other members of Industrial Revelation are D'Vonne Lewis (drums), Evan Flory-Barnes (bass), and Josh Rawlings (keyboards).

In 2012, Oluo was selected as Town Hall Seattle's first-ever artist-in-residence. During their time as the artist-in-residence, they created an experimental autobiographical pop opera, "Now I'm Fine," about the year their father died. The full-length opera (co-written with Lindy West) debuted in December 2014, at On the Boards theater, complete with a 17-piece orchestra, and received positive reviews. Seattle Times critic Misha Berson said Oluo possibly created "a new art form" by combining their own big-band jazz pieces with a blend of standup comedy and memoir. The piece went on to New York City's Public Theater in January 2016 as part of the Under the Radar Festival and was also staged at the Clarice Smith Performing Arts Center at the University of Maryland in February 2017. The New York Times reviewed the Public Theater run of "Now I'm Fine," saying that Oluo expanded the format of the "standard, modest, one-man confessional show" to "dizzying proportions" and described the score as "modernist jazz [that] leans toward solemnity, suggesting a New Orleans funeral march."

The film Thin Skin, starring Oluo was based on their off-Broadway play Now, I'm Fine and their This American Life episode "The Wedding Crasher". The film premiered in 2020 at the Bentonville Film Festival online, due to the COVID-19 pandemic. In November 2023, the film was released on streaming platforms and screened in theaters in Seattle, Los Angeles, and New York City. Oluo wrote the film's script with Lindy West and Charles Mudede. Mudede also directed. The producers of the film were Michael Seiwerath, Jennessa West, and Jonathan Caso. Oluo's sister Ijeoma Oluo appears in the film as herself.

As a comedian, they have collaborated closely with Hari Kondabolu, who described them in 2010 as "my great friend and writing partner."

== Personal life ==
Oluo is biracial; their father is a black immigrant from Nigeria and their mother is a white woman from Kansas. Oluo says they never met their father, who died in 2006, but spoke to him once over the phone. Their older sister is writer and activist Ijeoma Oluo.

Oluo has been married three times. Their first marriage ended in 2006. They have two children, born around 2002 and 2004. Oluo married writer Lindy West on July 11, 2015. They and West practice polyamory and have a third romantic partner, Roya Amirsoleymani.
