= List of Jamaican Patois words of African origin =

The list of African words in Jamaican Patois notes down as many loan words in Jamaican Patois that can be traced back to specific African languages, the majority of which are Twi words. Most of these African words have arrived in Jamaica through the enslaved Africans that were transported there in the era of the Atlantic slave trade.

Many of the African-derived words in Jamaican Patois relate to food, spirituality, the body, interpersonal relationships, and social behavior, reflecting the cultural priorities and lived experiences of enslaved communities. For example, "duppy" (ghost) is believed to derive from Akan or Ga languages, while "nyam" (to eat) may come from Twi or Fula. Jamaican Patois is significantly influenced by African languages, extending beyond vocabulary to include elements like rhythm, tone, and syntax. Notably, it features serial verbs, tonal emphasis, and a lack of subject-verb agreement, which are characteristics aligned with African linguistic patterns. These linguistic contributions are a vital part of Jamaica’s cultural identity and continue to shape the nation’s literature, music, and oral traditions.

Patwa	Language	Original word	Description
Accompong Town	Akan	Acheampong, an Asante name. The name of Nanny of the Maroons and her brother who founded the Maroon town of the same name.	
Ackee, akeee	Akan	Ánkyẽ	"a type of food/fruit", "cashew fruits"
Duppy, Dopi	Akan, Ga Language(an Akan loanword, Ga has many Akan loanwords and were at one point conquered by the much more powerful and numerous Akwamu-Akan)	Adópé (Dwarf in Ga language, but borrowed from Twi like many Ga customs. In Akan culture, ghosts take the form of dwarves[Mmotia] and apes[aboatia or adopeh] [note the -tia as a Twi suffix to denote a small stature, ghosts in Akan culture and Jamaica are seen as shape-shifters, they can be very big or very small. But are commonly so small they would be microscopic. Akans are the only West Africans that have dwarves as spiritual entities, which are considered to be tricksters. The word is said among the Ga people but the Jamaican application of the word matches the now extinct and former Akan word. An Akan origin for Duppy is far more likely.)	Demon, Ghost, often written in Jamaican English as "duppy"
Red Eye	Akan	Ani bere	"envious – direct translation from Akan into English"
Adrue	Akan, Ewe(The Akwamu-Akan also conquered the Ewe and introduced to them concepts such as matrilineal inheritance, stools and of course Akan loanwords the Ewe were originally and still are patrilineal.)	Adúru, adrú	"powder, medicine, drug"
Afasia, afasayah	Akan, Ewe	Afaséw, afaséɛ	"inferior wild yam"
Afu yam	Akan	Afúw	"farm" or "plantation"
Ahpetti	Akan	O-peyi	A certain amulet
Anansi	Akan	Anansi	"Spider" also name Akan folktale character.
Bafan	Akan	Bafan	a cripple.
Bissy	Akan	Bese	Kola Nut
Brownin'	Akan	Oburoni	a white or near white person
Buddy	Akan	Boɔdeɛ (pronounced:buddy)	plantain. In Jamaica, the penis was compared to the shape of the plantain.
Butu dung(verb)	Akan	Butu	to stoop or squat
Burru	Asante-Akan	Kete music	from the twi 'Aburukwa', the smallest drum in Kete music. Kete is a form of war drumming that originated with the Asante people, then spread to other Akans. In Jamaica. It is called Buru.
Buru	Akan	Abrɔ(pronounced as Aburu) meaning destructive.	
Casha	Asante-Akan	Kaseɛ́	Acacia or "thorn"
Dokunu	Fante-Akan	Dɔkono	(also known as blue draws or tie-a-leaf in Jamaica) food, a dessert item similar to bread pudding.
Cocobay	Akan	Kokobé	"leprosy"
Fufu yam	Akan	Fufuo meaning white and referring to the Akan dish which is a pounded into a paste of white yam and cassava.	white yam
Ginal	Akan (Ashanti Twi)	Gyegyefuo, Gyegyeni.	Someone that is not taken seriously, a stupid person. A con-man (in Jamaica only)
Kaba-kaba	Yoruba		"unreliable, inferior, worthless"
Kas-Kas	Akan	Kasakasa	An Argument
Kete	Asante-Akan	Aburukwa	"the smallest drum in Kete music"
Come-come-see or Konkonsa	Akan	Konkonsa	"gossip"
Mumu	West African		"dumb", "stupid"
Odum	Akan	Odum	a type of tree
Obeah	Akan (Ashanti Twi)	Ɔbayi	"witchcraft"
Opete	Akan	Opete; archaic but preserved by the maroons, now replaced by John Crow, a Fante slave trader named John Correntee (Kurentsir). Contemporary Jamaicans use the term John Crow to mean vulture and as an insult to mean a traitor or evil person.	"vulture"
Paki	Akan	apakyi	calabash
Patu	Akan	Patu	"owl"
Printing Man	Asante-Akan	Aprentengman	a type of drum used in Kete and Buru music.
Poto-poto	universally West African		"mud", "muddy"
Pum-pum Yam, Pum Pum	Akan	Ɔpuna Bayere(Puna Yam)	Punani or Puna person a yam that resembles the lower half of a woman's ulva. Pum-pum means ulva or vagina in Jamaica.
Backra	Efik	Mbakára	"white man"
Juk	Fula	Jukka	"poke", "spur"
Attoo	Igbo	átú	"chewing stick"
Breechee	Igbo	Mbùríchì	Nri-Igbo nobleman
Chink, chinch	Igbo	chị́nchị̀	'bedbug'
Country ibo	Igbo	Ị̀gbò	Pluchea odorata or Ptisana purpurascens
Himba	Igbo	Mba	"yam root", a type of yam, Rajania cordata
Nyam	Fula	Nyam	to eat
Okra	Igbo	ọkwurụ	a type of vegetable
Red Ibo, Eboe	Igbo	Ị̀gbò	a person with a light skin colour or a mulatto of mixed parentage
Unu	Igbo	únù	"you (plural)"
Dingki	Kongo		funeral ceremony
Dundus	Kongo	ndundu	"albino", "white person", "European"
Abe	Akan	Abe	Palm coconut seed
Pinda	Kongo		"peanut"

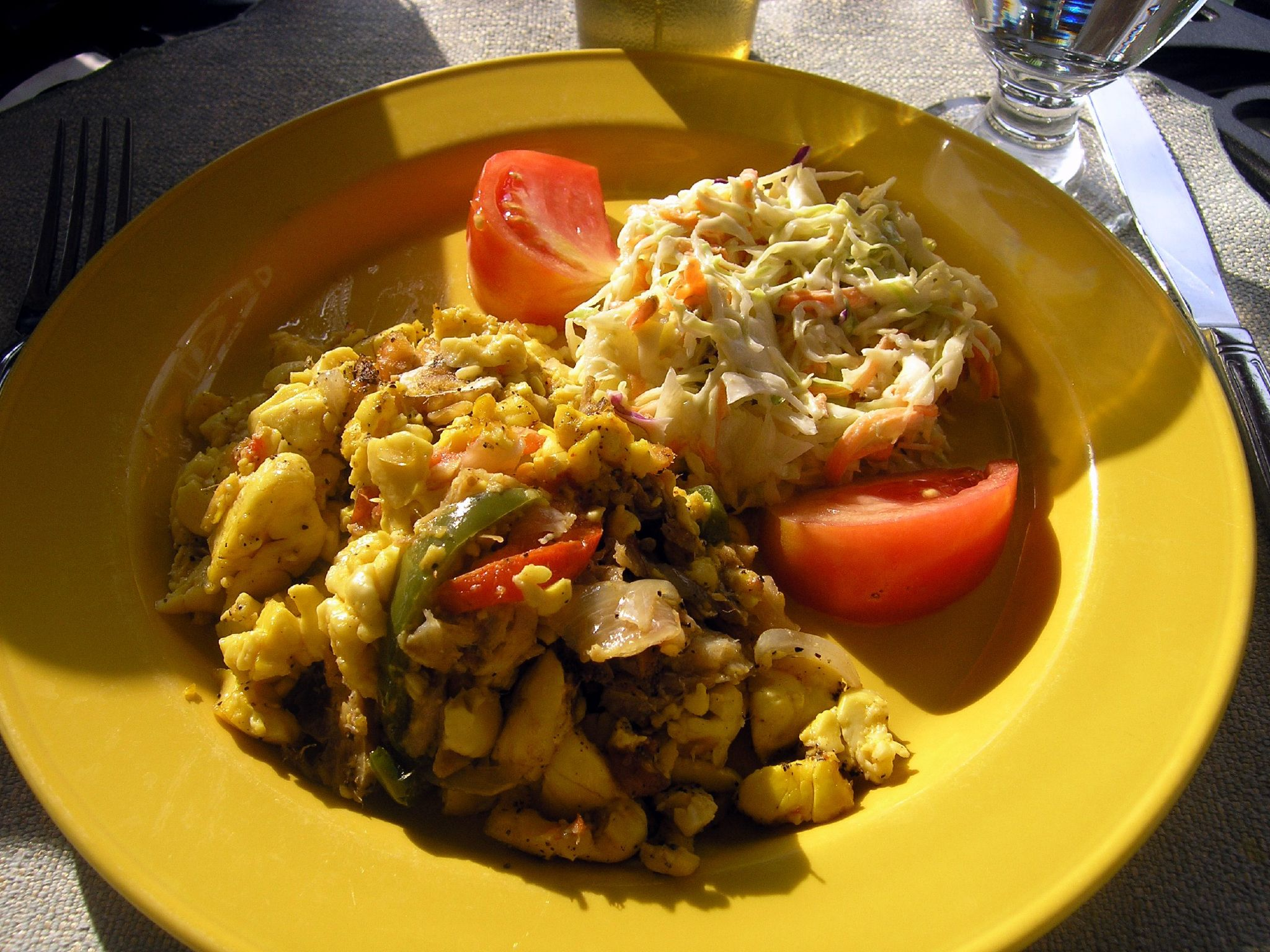
Ackee and saltfish, a Jamaican dish whose name includes African-origin words.

== Bibliography ==
- McWhorter, John H. (2000). The Missing Spanish Creoles: Recovering the Birth of Plantation Contact Languages. University of California Press. ISBN 0-520-21999-6.
- Graddol, David; Leith, Dick; Swann, Joan (1996). English: history, diversity, and change. Routledge. ISBN 0-415-13117-0.
- Bartens, Ángela (2003). A contrastive grammar: Islander - Caribbean Standard English - Spanish. Finnish Academy of Science and Letters. ISBN 951-41-0940-6.
- Allsopp, Richard; Allsopp, Jeannette (2003). Dictionary of Caribbean English Usage. University of the West Indies Press. ISBN 9766401454.
- Institute of Jamaica (2000). "Jamaica journal". Jamaica Journal. 27–28. Institute of Jamaica.
- Cassidy, Frederic Gomes; Page, Robert Brock Le (2002). A Dictionary of Jamaican English (2nd ed.). University of the West Indies Press. ISBN 976-640-127-6.
- Mittelsdorf, Sibylle (1978). African retentions in Jamaican Creole: a reassessment. Northwestern University.
- Menz, Jessica (2008). London Jamaican-Jamaican Creole in London. GRIN Verlag. ISBN 978-3-638-94849-4.
- Watson, G. Llewellyn (1991). Jamaican sayings: with notes on folklore, aesthetics, and social control. University Press of Florida. ISBN 0-8130-1053-5.
- Holloway, Joseph E. (2005). Africanisms in American culture. Indiana University Press. ISBN 0-253-21749-0.
- Rickford, John R.; Romaine, Suzanne; Sato, Charlene J. (1999). Creole genesis, attitudes and discourse: studies celebrating Charlene J. Sato. John Benjamins Publishing Company. ISBN 90-272-5242-4.
- Lewis, Maureen Warner (1996). African continuities in the linguistic heritage of Jamaica. African Caribbean Institute of Jamaica.
- Eltis, David; Richardson, David (1997). Routes to slavery: direction, ethnicity, and mortality in the transatlantic slave trade. Routledge. ISBN 0-7146-4820-5.
- Huber, Magnus; Parkvall, Mikael (1999). Spreading the word: the issue of diffusion among the Atlantic Creoles. University of Westminster Press. ISBN 1-85919-093-6.
- Sheller, Mimi (2003). Consuming the Caribbean: from Arawaks to zombies. Routledge. ISBN 0-415-25760-3.
