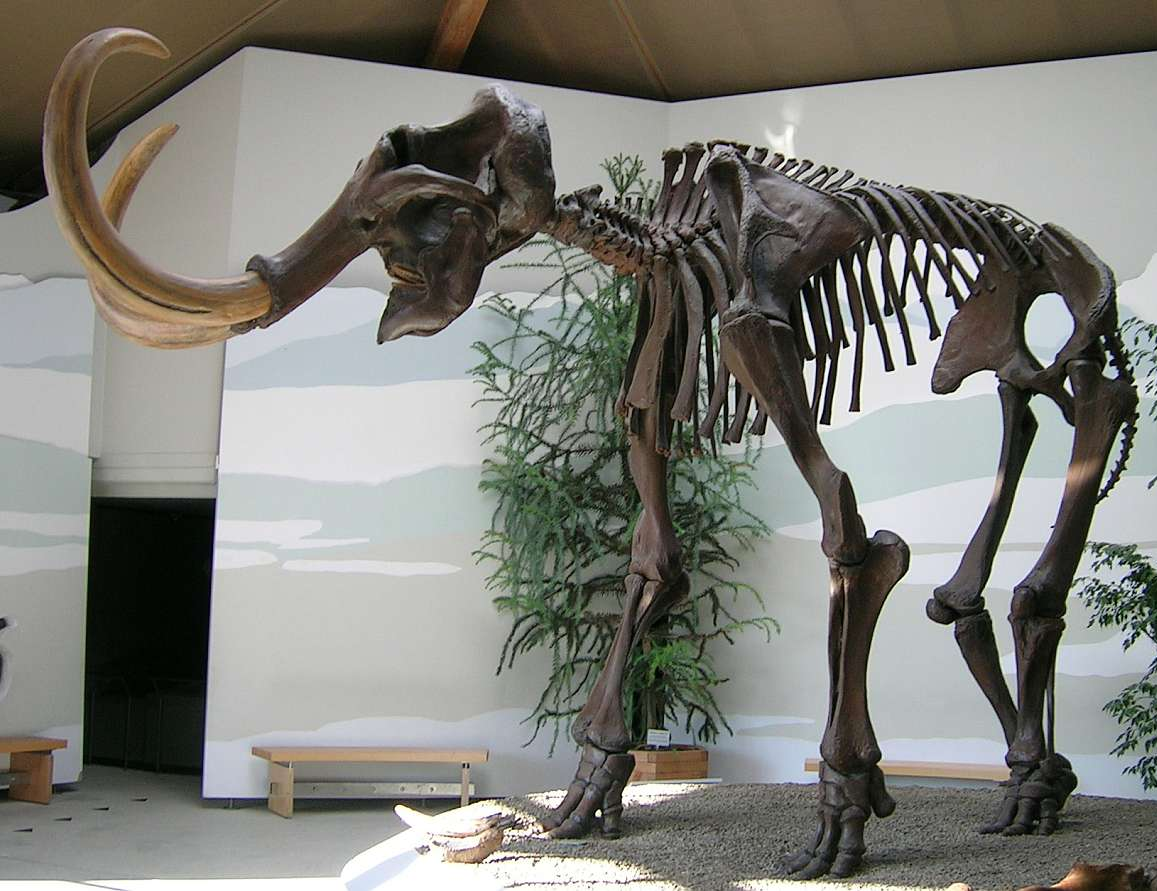
- Largest European specimen, a male at Mammut-Museum Siegsdorf

Scientific classification
- Kingdom: Animalia
- Phylum: Chordata
- Class: Mammalia
- Order: Proboscidea
- Family: Elephantidae
- Genus: †Mammuthus
- Species: †M. primigenius

Binomial name
- †Mammuthus primigenius (Blumenbach, 1799)
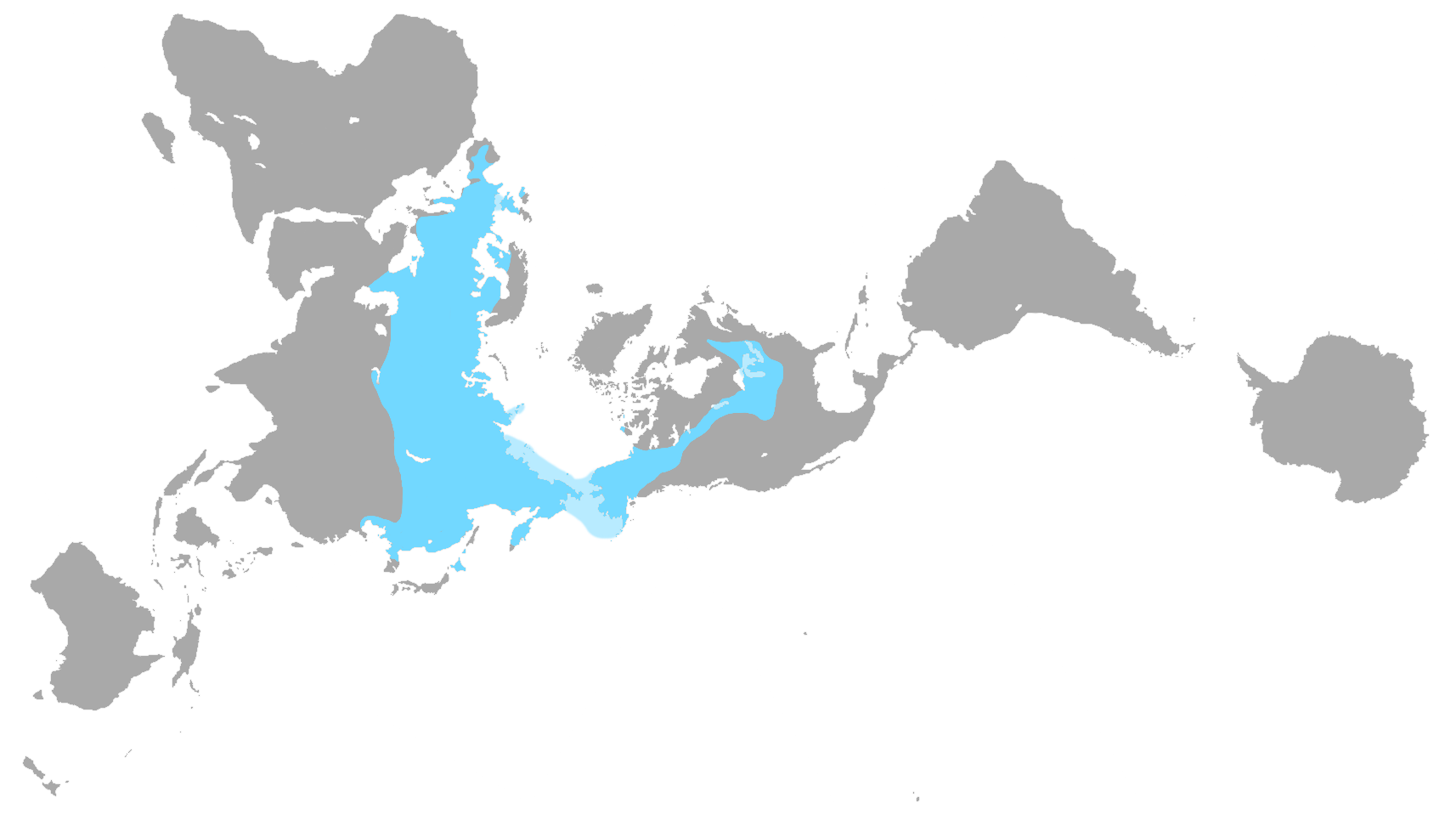
- Dymaxion map showing the Late Pleistocene distribution of M. primigenius in blue (light blue was land at the time), inferred from fossil finds

Synonyms
- List: Elephas primigenius Blumenbach, 1799; Elephas mammonteus Cuvier, 1799; Mammuthus boreus Brookes, 1828; Mammonteus primigenius Osborn, 1924; Elephas boreus Hay, 1924

= Woolly mammoth =

Woolly mammoth Temporal range: Middle Pleistocene – Late Holocene (c. 400,000–2000 BC)

Extinct species of mammoth

The woolly mammoth (Mammuthus primigenius) is an extinct species of mammoth that lived from the Middle Pleistocene until its extinction in the Holocene epoch. It was one of the last in a line of mammoth species, beginning with the African Mammuthus subplanifrons in the early Pliocene. The woolly mammoth began to diverge from the steppe mammoth about 800,000 years ago in Siberia. Its closest extant relative is the Asian elephant. The Columbian mammoth (Mammuthus columbi) lived alongside the woolly mammoth in North America, and DNA studies show that the two hybridised with each other. Mammoth remains were long known in Asia before they became known to Europeans. The origin of these remains was long debated and often explained as the remains of legendary creatures. The mammoth was identified as an extinct elephant species by Georges Cuvier in 1796.

The appearance and behaviour of the woolly mammoth are among the best studied of any prehistoric animal because of the discovery of frozen carcasses in Siberia and North America, as well as skeletons, teeth, stomach contents, dung, and depiction from life in prehistoric cave paintings. It was roughly the same size as modern African elephants. Males reached shoulder heights between 2.67 and 3.49 m (8 ft 9 in and 11 ft 5 in) and weighed between 3.9 and 8.2 t (3.8 and 8.1 long tons; 4.3 and 9.0 short tons). Females reached 2.3–2.6 m (7 ft 7 in – 8 ft 6 in) in shoulder heights and weighed between 2.8 and 4 t (2.8 and 3.9 long tons; 3.1 and 4.4 short tons). A newborn calf weighed about 90 kg (200 lb).

The woolly mammoth was well adapted to the cold environments present during glacial periods, including the last ice age. It was covered in fur, with an outer covering of long guard hairs and a shorter undercoat. The colour of the coat varied from dark to light. The ears were small and tail was short to minimise frostbite and heat loss. It had long, curved tusks and four molars, which were replaced six times during the lifetime of an individual. Its behaviour was similar to that of modern elephants, and it used its tusks and trunk for manipulating objects, fighting, and foraging. The diet of the woolly mammoth was mainly forbs and grasses. Individuals could probably reach the age of 60. Its habitat was the mammoth steppe, which stretched across northern Eurasia and North America.

The woolly mammoth coexisted with early humans, who hunted the species for food, and used its bones and tusks for making art, tools, and dwellings. The population of woolly mammoths declined at the end of the Late Pleistocene, with the last populations on mainland Siberia persisting until around 10,000 years ago, although isolated populations survived on St. Paul Island until 5,600 years ago and on Wrangel Island until 4,000 years ago. After its extinction, humans continued using its ivory as a raw material, a tradition that continues today. The completion of the mammoth genome project in 2015 sparked discussion about potentially reviving the woolly mammoth through several various methods. However, none of these approaches are currently feasible.

== Taxonomy ==
Remains of woolly mammoths were long known by native Siberians and Native Americans, who had various ways of interpreting them. Remains later reached other parts of Asia and Europe, where they were also interpreted in various ways prior to modern science. The first woolly mammoth remains studied by scientists were examined by the British physician Hans Sloane in 1728 and consisted of fossilised teeth and tusks from Siberia. Sloane was the first to recognise that the remains belonged to elephants. Sloane turned to another biblical explanation for the presence of elephants in the Arctic, asserting that they had been buried during the Great Flood, and that Siberia had previously been tropical before a drastic climate change. Others interpreted Sloane's conclusion slightly differently, arguing the flood had carried elephants from the tropics to the Arctic. Sloane's paper was based on travellers' descriptions and a few scattered bones collected in Siberia and Britain. He discussed the question of whether or not the remains were from elephants, but drew no conclusions.

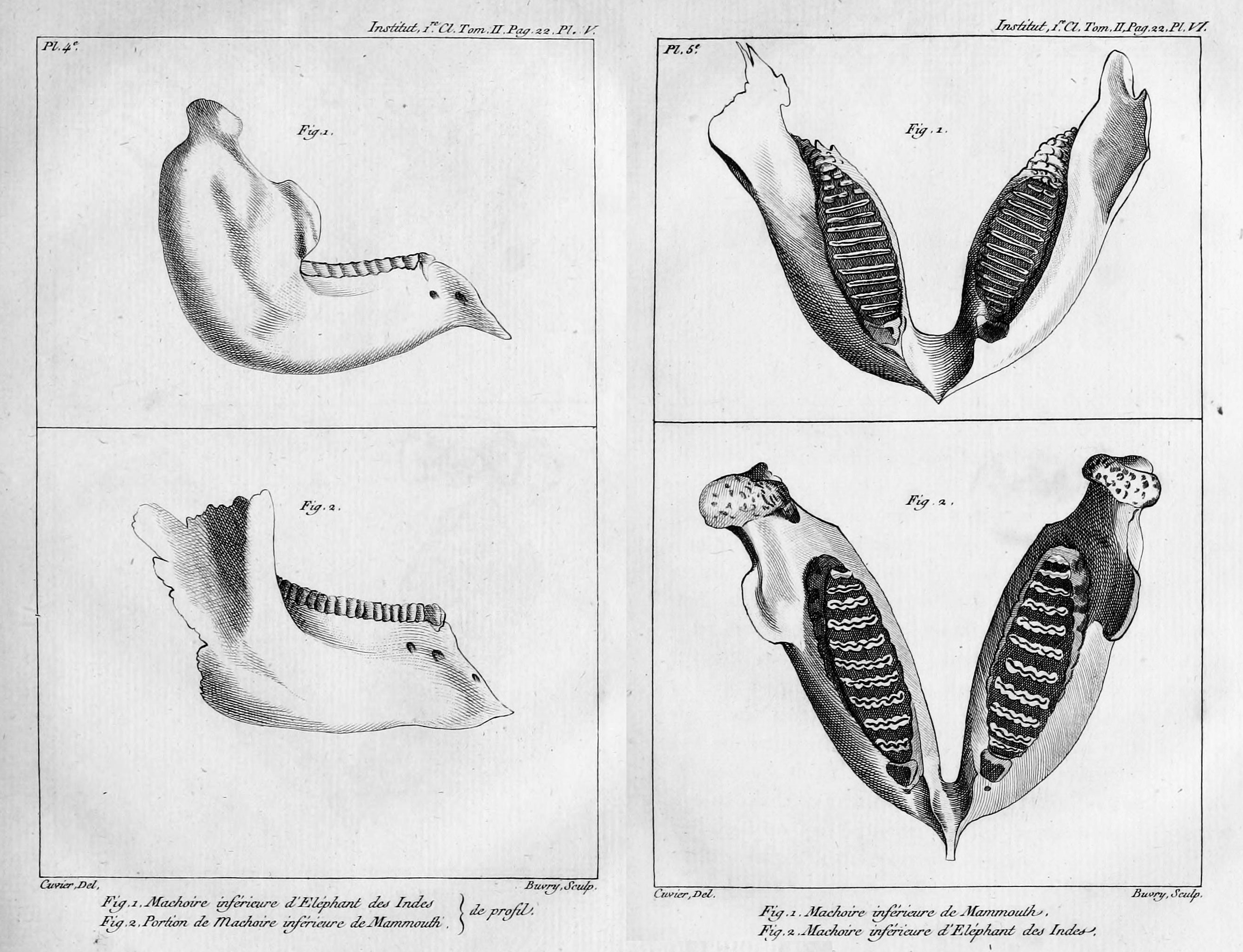
Georges Cuvier's 1796 comparison between the mandible of a woolly mammoth (bottom left and top right) and an Indian elephant (top left and bottom right)

In 1738, the German zoologist Johann Philipp Breyne argued that mammoth fossils represented some kind of elephant. He could not explain why a tropical animal would be found in such a cold area as Siberia, and suggested that they might have been transported there by the Great Flood. In 1796, French biologist Georges Cuvier was the first to identify the woolly mammoth remains not as modern elephants transported to the Arctic, but as an entirely new species. He argued this species had gone extinct and no longer existed, a concept that was not widely accepted at the time. Following Cuvier's identification, the German naturalist Johann Friedrich Blumenbach gave the woolly mammoth its scientific name, Elephas primigenius, in 1799, placing it in the same genus as the Asian elephant (Elephas maximus). This name is Latin for 'the first-born elephant'. Cuvier coined the name Elephas mammonteus a few months later, but the former name was subsequently used. In 1828, the British naturalist Joshua Brookes used the name Mammuthus borealis for woolly mammoth fossils in his collection that he put up for sale, thereby coining a new genus name.

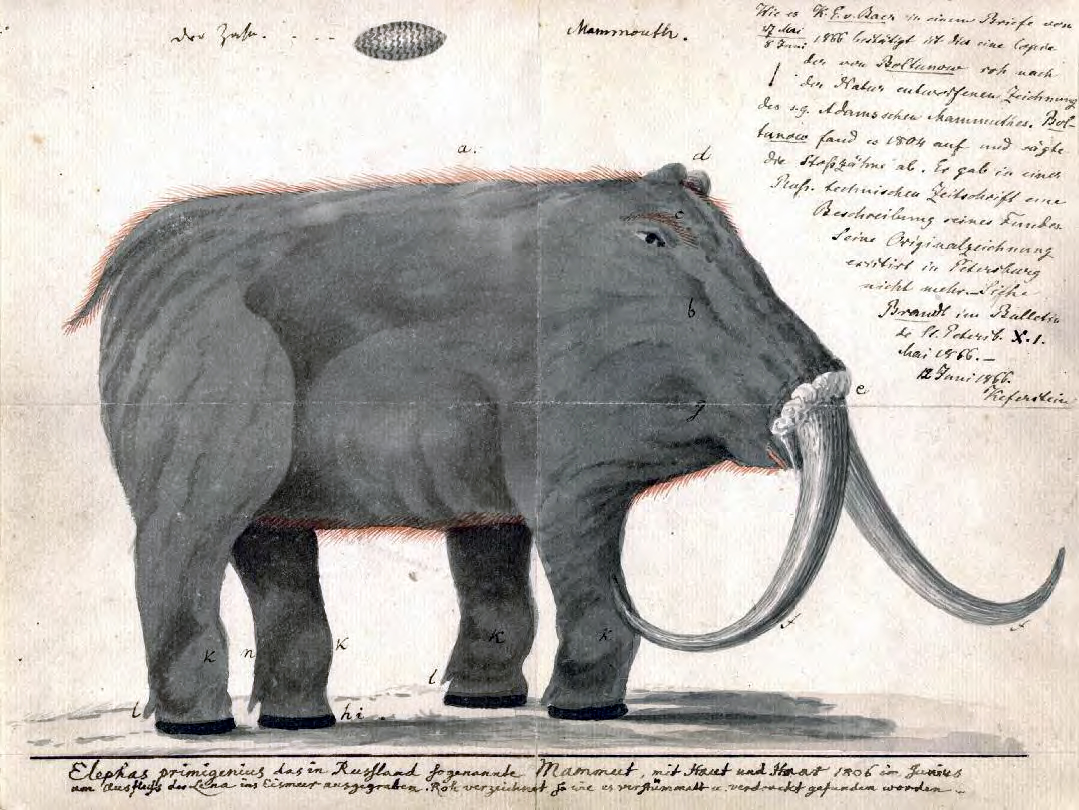
Copy of an interpretation of the "Adams mammoth" carcass from around 1800, with Johann Friedrich Blumenbach's handwriting

Where and how the word mammoth originated is unclear. According to the Oxford English Dictionary, it comes from an old Vogul word mēmoŋt 'earth-horn'. It may be a version of mehemot, the Arabic version of the biblical word behemoth. Another possible origin is Estonian, in which maa means 'earth' and mutt means 'mole'. The word was first used in Europe during the early 17th century, when referring to maimanto tusks discovered in Siberia. The American president Thomas Jefferson, who had a keen interest in palaeontology, was partially responsible for transforming the word mammoth from a noun describing the prehistoric elephant to an adjective describing anything of surprisingly large size. The first recorded use of the word as an adjective was in a description of a wheel of cheese (the "Cheshire Mammoth Cheese") given to Jefferson in 1802.

By the early 20th century, the taxonomy of extinct elephants was complex. In 1942, American palaeontologist Henry Fairfield Osborn's posthumous monograph on the Proboscidea was published, wherein he used various taxon names that had previously been proposed for mammoth species, including replacing Mammuthus with Mammonteus, as he believed the former name to be invalidly published. Mammoth taxonomy was simplified by various researchers from the 1970s onwards, all species were retained in the genus Mammuthus, and many proposed differences between species were instead interpreted as intraspecific variation.

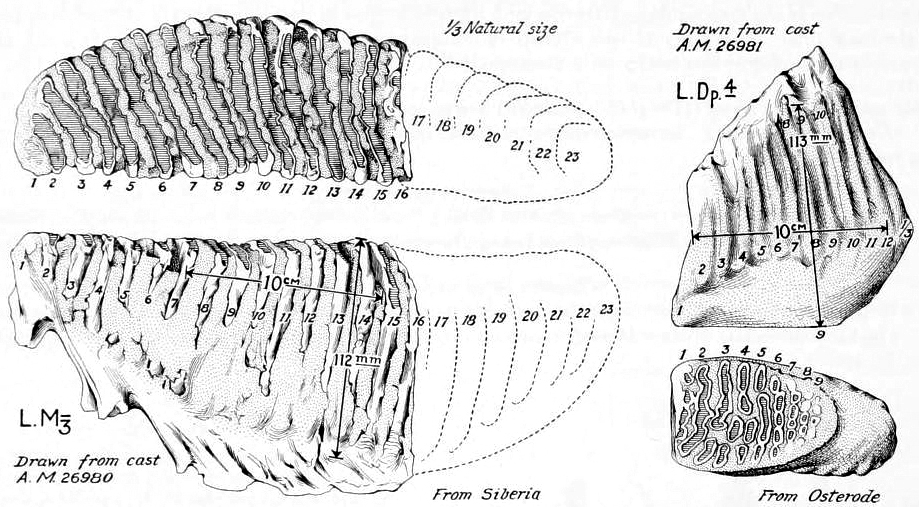
1930s illustration of the lectotype molars; the left one is now lost.

Osborn chose two molars (found in Siberia and Osterode) from Blumenbach's collection at Göttingen University as the lectotype specimens for the woolly mammoth, since holotype designation was not practised in Blumenbach's time, and one of the specimens Blumenbach had described had been of the unrelated straight-tusked elephant (Palaeoloxodon antiquus). Soviet palaeontologist Vera Gromova further proposed the former should be considered the lectotype with the latter as paralectotype. Both molars were thought lost by the 1980s, and the more complete "Taimyr mammoth" found in Siberia in 1948 was therefore proposed as the neotype specimen in 1990. Resolutions to historical issues about the validity of the genus name Mammuthus and the type species designation of E. primigenius were also proposed. The paralectotype molar (specimen GZG.V.010.018) has since been located in the Göttingen University collection, identified by comparing it with Osborn's illustration of a cast.

=== Evolution ===
The earliest known members of the Proboscidea, the clade which contains modern elephants, existed about 55 million years ago around the Tethys Sea. The closest known relatives of the Proboscidea are the sirenians (dugongs and manatees) and the hyraxes (an order of small, herbivorous mammals). The family Elephantidae existed 6 million years ago in Africa and includes the modern elephants and the mammoths. Among many now-extinct clades, the mastodon (Mammut) is only a distant relative of the mammoths and part of the separate family Mammutidae, which diverged 25 million years before the mammoths evolved. The Asian elephant is the closest extant relative of the mammoths. The following cladogram shows the placement of the woolly mammoth among Late Pleistocene and modern proboscideans, based on genetic data:

- - †Mammut americanum (American mastodon)
  - - †Notiomastodon platensis (South American gomphothere)
    - Elephantidae
      - - - †Mammuthus columbi (Columbian mammoth)
          - †Mammuthus primigenius (woolly mammoth)
        - - Elephas maximus (Asian elephant)
      - - †Palaeoloxodon antiquus (European straight-tusked elephant)
        - - Loxodonta cyclotis (African forest elephant)
          - Loxodonta africana (African bush elephant)

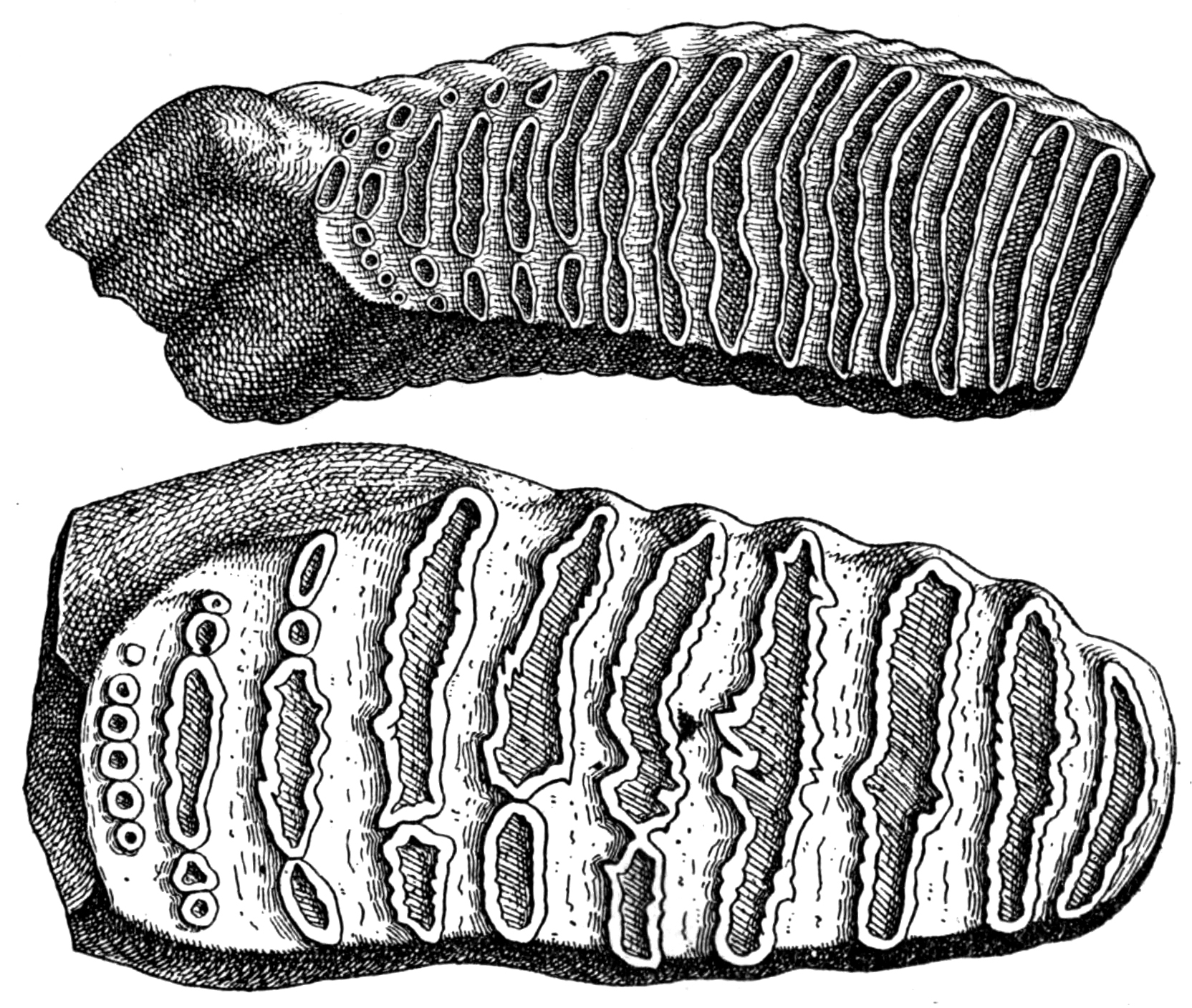
Comparison between the lower molars of a woolly mammoth (above) and a southern mammoth; note the lower number of enamel ridges in the older species (below)

Within six weeks from 2005 to 2006, three teams of researchers independently assembled mitochondrial genome profiles of the woolly mammoth from ancient DNA, which allowed them to confirm the close evolutionary relationship between mammoths and Asian elephants (Elephas maximus). A 2015 DNA review confirmed Asian elephants as the closest living relative of the woolly mammoth. African elephants (Loxodonta africana) branched away from this clade around 6 million years ago, close to the time of the similar split between chimpanzees and humans. A 2010 study confirmed these relationships and suggested the mammoth and Asian elephant lineages diverged 5.8–7.8 million years ago, while African elephants diverged from an earlier common ancestor 6.6–8.8 million years ago.

In 2008, much of the woolly mammoth's chromosomal DNA was mapped. The analysis showed that the woolly mammoth and the African elephant are 98.55% to 99.40% identical. The team mapped the woolly mammoth's nuclear genome sequence by extracting DNA from the hair follicles of both a 20,000-year-old mammoth retrieved from permafrost and another that died 60,000 years ago. In 2012, proteins were confidently identified for the first time, collected from a 43,000-year-old woolly mammoth.

Since many remains of each species of mammoth are known from several localities, reconstructing the evolutionary history of the genus through morphological studies is possible. Mammoth species can be identified from the number of enamel ridges (or lamellar plates) on their molars; primitive species had few ridges, and the number increased gradually as new species evolved to feed on more abrasive food items. The crowns of the teeth became deeper in height and the skulls became taller to accommodate this. At the same time, the skulls became shorter from front to back to minimise the weight of the head. The short and tall skulls of woolly and Columbian mammoths (Mammuthus columbi) were the culmination of this process.

The first known members of the genus Mammuthus are the African species Mammuthus subplanifrons from the Pliocene, and M. africanavus from the Pleistocene. The former is thought to be the ancestor of later forms. Mammoths entered Europe around 3 million years ago. The earliest European mammoth has been named M. rumanus; it spread across Europe and China. Only its molars are known, which show that it had 8–10 enamel ridges. A population evolved 12–14 ridges, splitting off from and replacing the earlier type, becoming the southern mammoth (M. meridionalis) about 2–1.7 million years ago. In turn, this species was replaced by the steppe mammoth (M. trogontherii) with 18–20 ridges, which evolved in eastern Asia around 1 million years ago. Mammoths derived from M. trogontherii evolved molars with 26 ridges 400,000 years ago in Siberia and became the woolly mammoth. The earliest identified forms of woolly mammoth date to the Middle Pleistocene. Woolly mammoths entered North America about 100,000 years ago by crossing the Bering Strait.

=== Subspecies and hybridisation ===
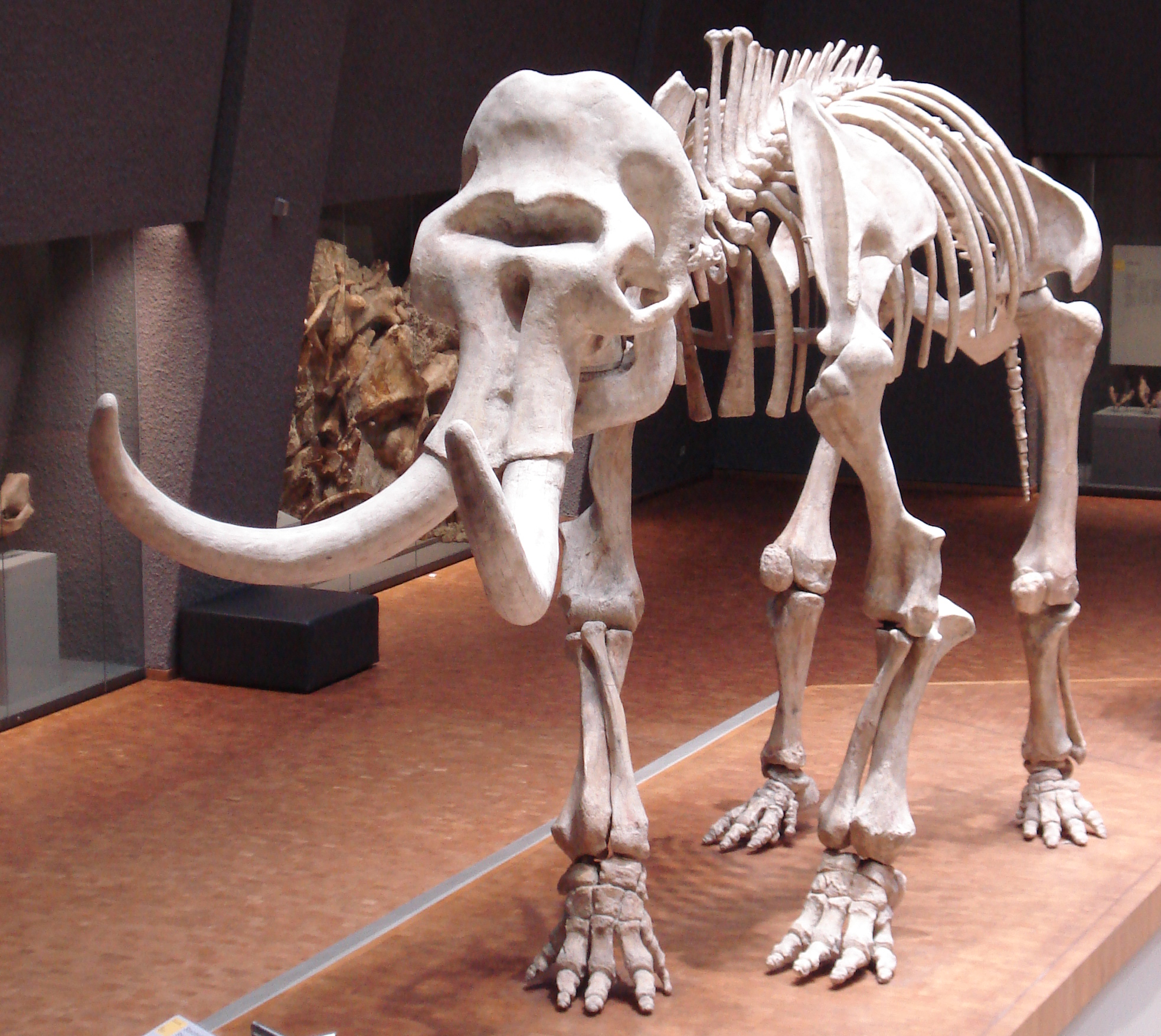
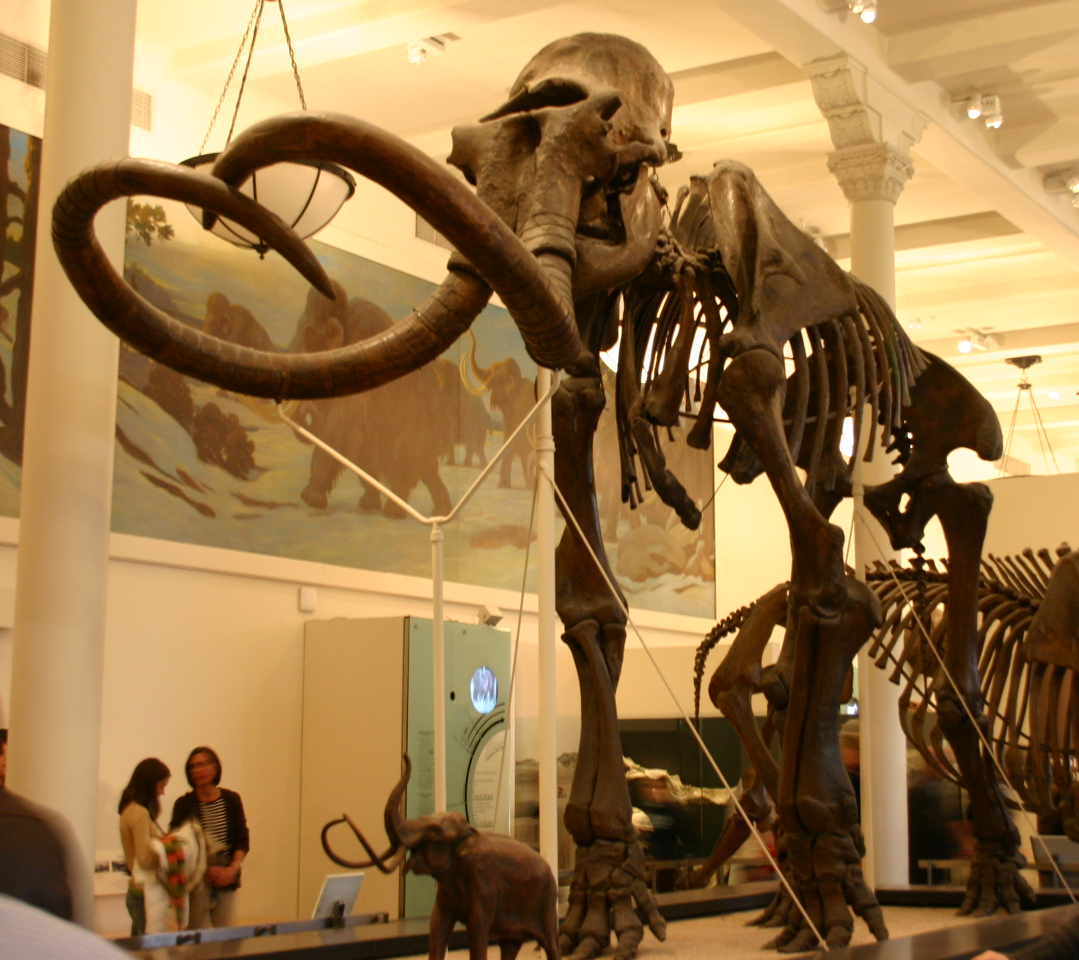
Cast of an intermediate form between M. trogontherii and M. primigenius; M. p. fraasi, Staatliches Museum für Naturkunde Stuttgart (left), and specimen (formerly assigned to M. jeffersonii) suggested to be a hybrid between Columbian and woolly mammoths at the American Museum of Natural History (right)

Individuals and populations showing transitional morphologies between each of the mammoth species are known, and primitive and derived species coexisted until the former disappeared. The different species and their intermediate forms have been termed "chronospecies". Many taxa intermediate between M. primigenius and other mammoths have been proposed, but their validity is uncertain; depending on author, they are either considered primitive forms of an advanced species or advanced forms of a primitive species. Distinguishing and determining these intermediate forms has been called one of the most long-lasting and complicated problems in Quaternary palaeontology. Regional and intermediate species and subspecies such as M. intermedius, M. chosaricus, M. p. primigenius, M. p. jatzkovi, M. p. sibiricus, M. p. fraasi, M. p. leith-adamsi, M. p. hydruntinus, M. p. astensis, M. p. americanus, M. p. compressus, and M. p. alaskensis have been proposed.

Phylogeny of mammoths, showing the relationship between the Columbian mammoth and woolly mammoth, as well as early steppe mammoth-like Siberian mammoths, demonstrating significant introgressive gene flow from the woolly mammoth into the Columbian mammoth

A 2011 genetic study showed that two examined specimens of the Columbian mammoth were grouped within a subclade of woolly mammoths. This suggests that the two populations interbred and produced fertile offspring. A North American type formerly referred to as M. jeffersonii may be a hybrid between the two species. A 2015 study suggested that the animals in the range where M. columbi and M. primigenius overlapped formed a metapopulation of hybrids with varying morphology. It suggested that Eurasian M. primigenius had a similar relationship with M. trogontherii in areas where their range overlapped. According to a 2025 study of mammoth teeth from Alberta, Canada, this area was a zone of sympatry and hybridisation between woolly and Columbian mammoths.

In 2021, DNA older than a million years was sequenced for the first time, from two mammoth teeth of Early Pleistocene age found in eastern Siberia. One tooth from Adycha (1–1.3 million years old) belonged to a lineage that was ancestral to later woolly mammoths, whereas the other from Krestovka (1.1–1.65 million years old) belonged to new lineage. The study found that half of the ancestry of Columbian mammoths came from relatives of the Krestovka lineage (which probably represented the first mammoths that colonised the Americas) and the other half from the lineage of woolly mammoths, with the hybridisation happening more than 420,000 years ago, during the Middle Pleistocene. Later woolly and Columbian mammoths also interbred occasionally, and mammoth species may have hybridised routinely when brought together by glacial expansion. These findings were the first evidence of hybrid speciation from ancient DNA. The study also found that genetic adaptations to cold environments, such as hair growth and fat deposits, were already present in the steppe mammoth lineage and were not unique to woolly mammoths.

A 2025 study found that two genetically sequenced molar teeth of Late Pleistocene age in British Columbia, Canada, belonged to mammoths of predominantly woolly mammoth ancestry, but harboured significant levels (21.6 ± 0.9% and 34.6 ± 0.1%) of Columbian mammoth ancestry, indicating interbreeding and bidirectional gene flow between Columbian mammoths and woolly mammoths during the Late Pleistocene in North America where their ranges overlapped, rather than just undirectional woolly mammoth gene flow into Columbian mammoths as had previously been recognised.

== Description ==
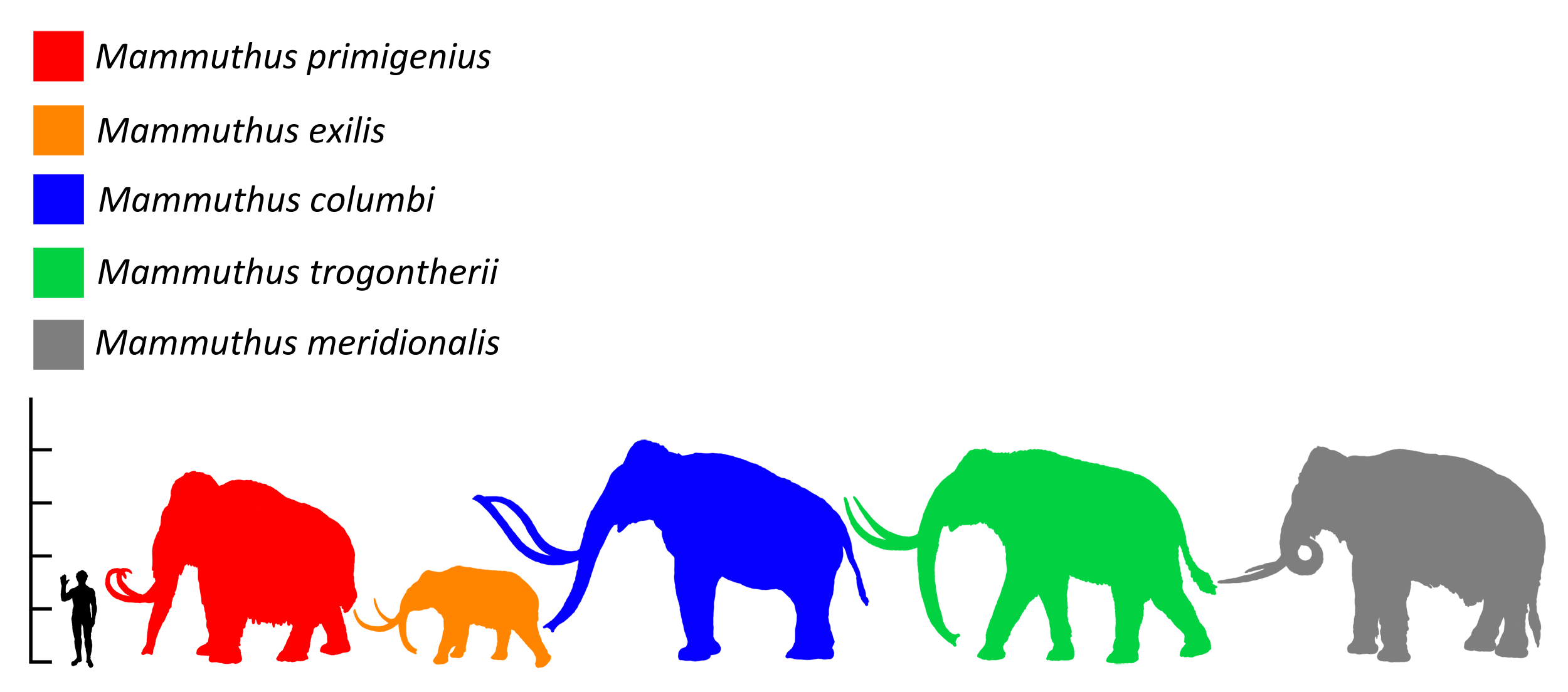
Size of a large woolly mammoth (in red) compared to a human and other mammoths (left), and size comparison of average-sized male (orange) and female (grey) woolly mammoths

The average shoulder height for males of the species has been estimated at 2.8–3.15 m (9 ft 2 in – 10 ft 4 in) with a weight of 4.5–6 t (9,900–13,200 lb), with females being smaller like living elephants, with a shoulder height of 2.3–2.6 m (7 ft 7 in – 8 ft 6 in) and a weight of 2.8–4 t (6,200–8,800 lb). This size is comparable to the largest living elephant species, the African bush elephant (Loxodonta africana), but is considerably smaller than the earlier Mammuthus meridionalis and Mammuthus trogontherii and the contemporary Mammuthus columbi. A newborn calf would have weighed about 90 kg (200 lb).

The woolly mammoth exhibited size variation throughout its range, with individuals from Western Europe being considerably larger (with adult males estimated to be on average 2.99–3.31 m (9 ft 10 in – 10 ft 10 in) tall and 5.2–6.9 t (11,000–15,000 lb) in weight) than those found in Siberia (with adult males of this population being estimated on average 2.66–2.94 m (8 ft 9 in – 9 ft 8 in) tall and 3.9–5.2 t (8,600–11,500 lb) in weight). One of the largest recorded woolly mammoths is the Siegsdorf specimen from Germany, estimated to be 50 years, with an estimated shoulder height of 3.49 m (11 ft 5 in) and an estimated body mass of 8.2 t (18,000 lb).

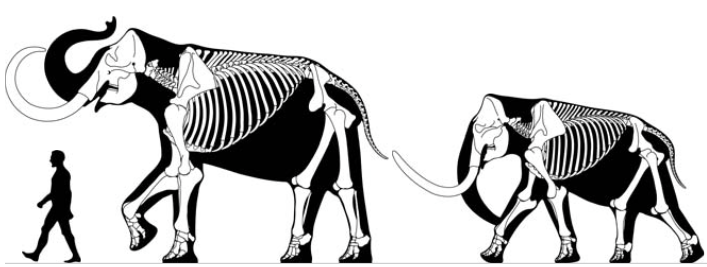
Skeletal diagram of a 3.5 m (11 ft) tall large European male from Siegsdorf and a smaller 2.7 m (8 ft 10 in) Siberian male compared to a human

Few frozen specimens have preserved genitals, so the sex is usually determined through examination of the skeleton. The best indication of sex is the size of the pelvic girdle, since the opening that functions as the birth canal is always wider in females than in males. Though the mammoths on Wrangel Island were smaller than those of the mainland, their size varied, and they were not small enough to be considered "island dwarfs". An adult male from the Holocene Wrangel Island population was estimated to have a height of 2.8 m (9 ft 2 in) and a weight of 4.5 t (9,900 lb). The last woolly mammoth populations are claimed to have decreased in size and increased their sexual dimorphism, but this was dismissed in a 2012 study.

The appearance of the woolly mammoth is probably the best known of any prehistoric animal due to the many frozen specimens with preserved soft tissue and depictions by contemporary humans in their art. Woolly mammoths had several adaptations to the cold, most noticeably the layer of fur covering all parts of their bodies. Other adaptations to cold weather include ears that are far smaller than those of modern elephants; they were about 38 cm (15 in) long and 18–28 cm (7.1–11.0 in) across, and the ear of the 6- to 12-month-old frozen calf "Dima" was under 13 cm (5.1 in) long. The small ears reduced heat loss and frostbite, and the tail was short for the same reason, only 36 cm (14 in) long in the "Berezovka mammoth". The tail contained 21 vertebrae, whereas the tails of modern elephants contain 28–33. Their skin was no thicker than that of present-day elephants, between 1.25 and 2.5 cm (0.49 and 0.98 in). They had a layer of fat up to 10 cm (3.9 in) thick under the skin, which helped to keep them warm. Woolly mammoths had broad flaps of skin under their tails which covered the anus; this is also seen in modern elephants.

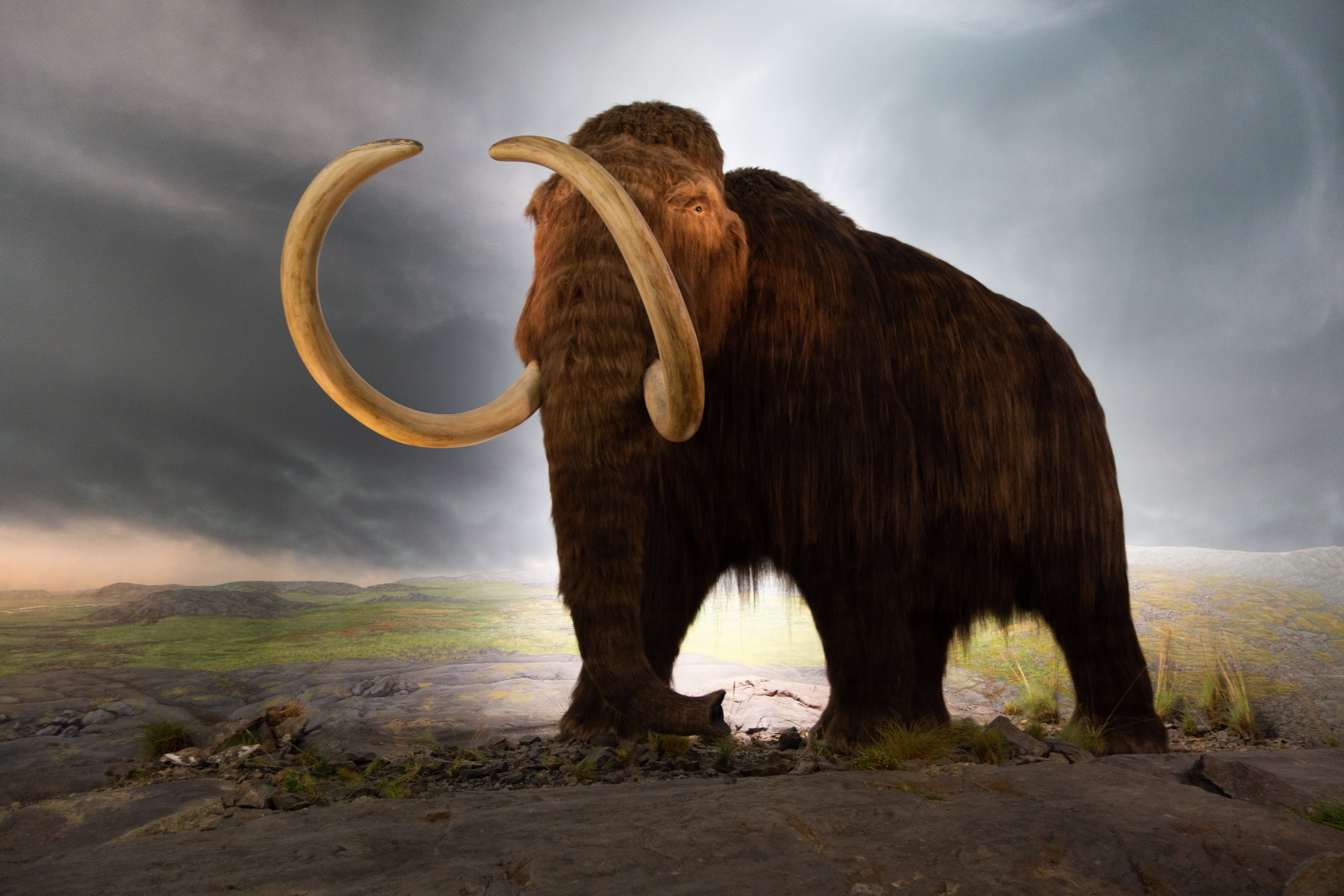
Model at the Royal BC Museum

Other characteristic features depicted in cave paintings include a large, high, single-domed head and a sloping back with a high shoulder hump; this shape resulted from the spinous processes of the back vertebrae decreasing in length from front to rear. These features were not present in juveniles, which had convex backs like Asian elephants. Another feature shown in cave paintings was confirmed by the discovery of a frozen specimen in 1924, an adult nicknamed the "Middle Kolyma mammoth", which was preserved with a complete trunk tip. Unlike the trunk lobes of modern elephants, the upper "finger" at the tip of the trunk had a long pointed lobe and was 10 cm (3.9 in) long, while the lower "thumb" was 5 cm (2.0 in) and was broader. The trunk of "Dima" was 76 cm (30 in) long, whereas the trunk of the adult "Liakhov mammoth" was 2 m (6 ft 7 in) long. The well-preserved trunk of a juvenile specimen nicknamed "Yuka" was described in 2015, and it was shown to possess a fleshy expansion a third above the tip. Rather than oval as the rest of the trunk, this part was ellipsoidal in cross section, and double the size in diameter. The feature was shown to be present in two other specimens, of different sexes and ages.

=== Coat ===
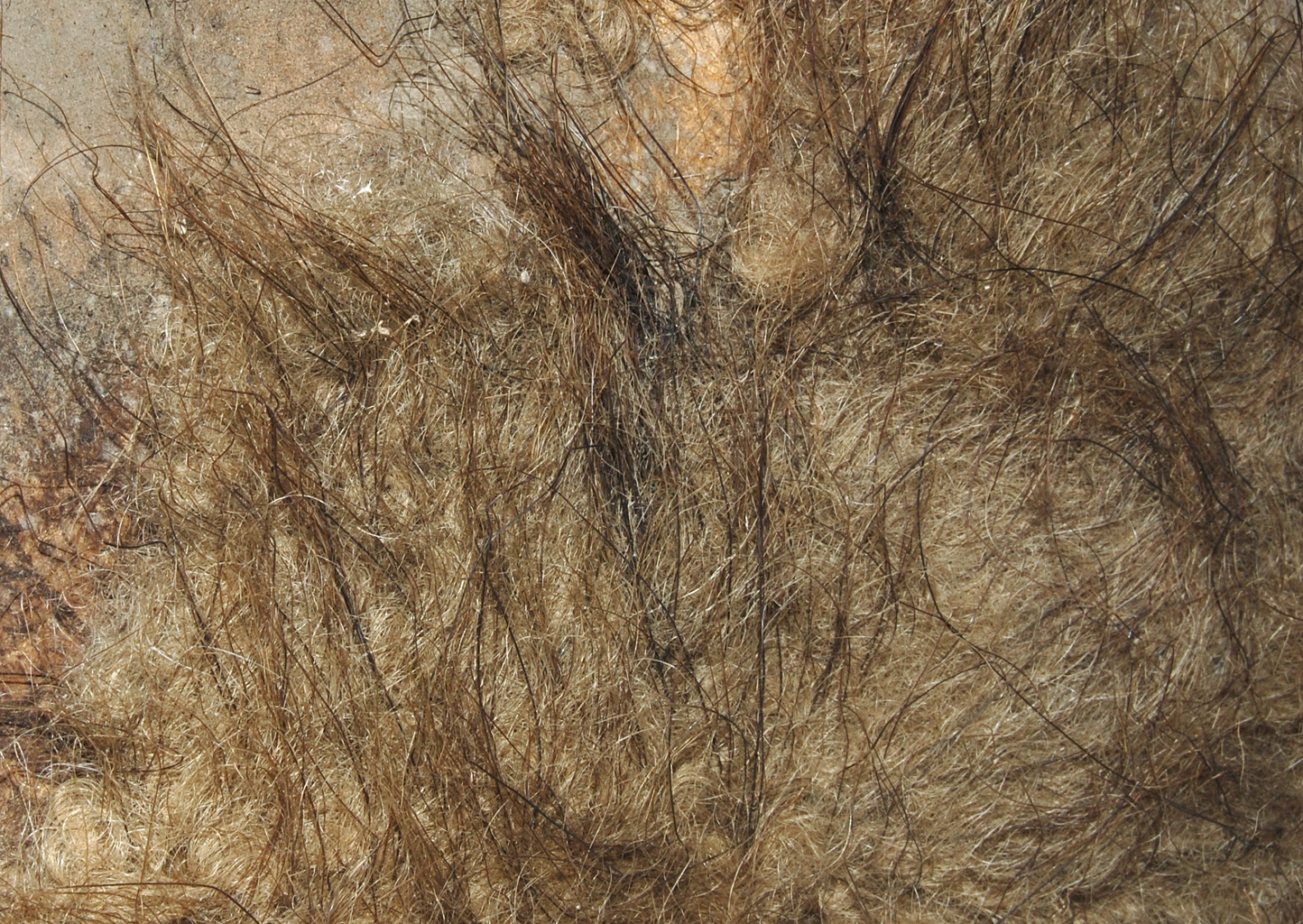
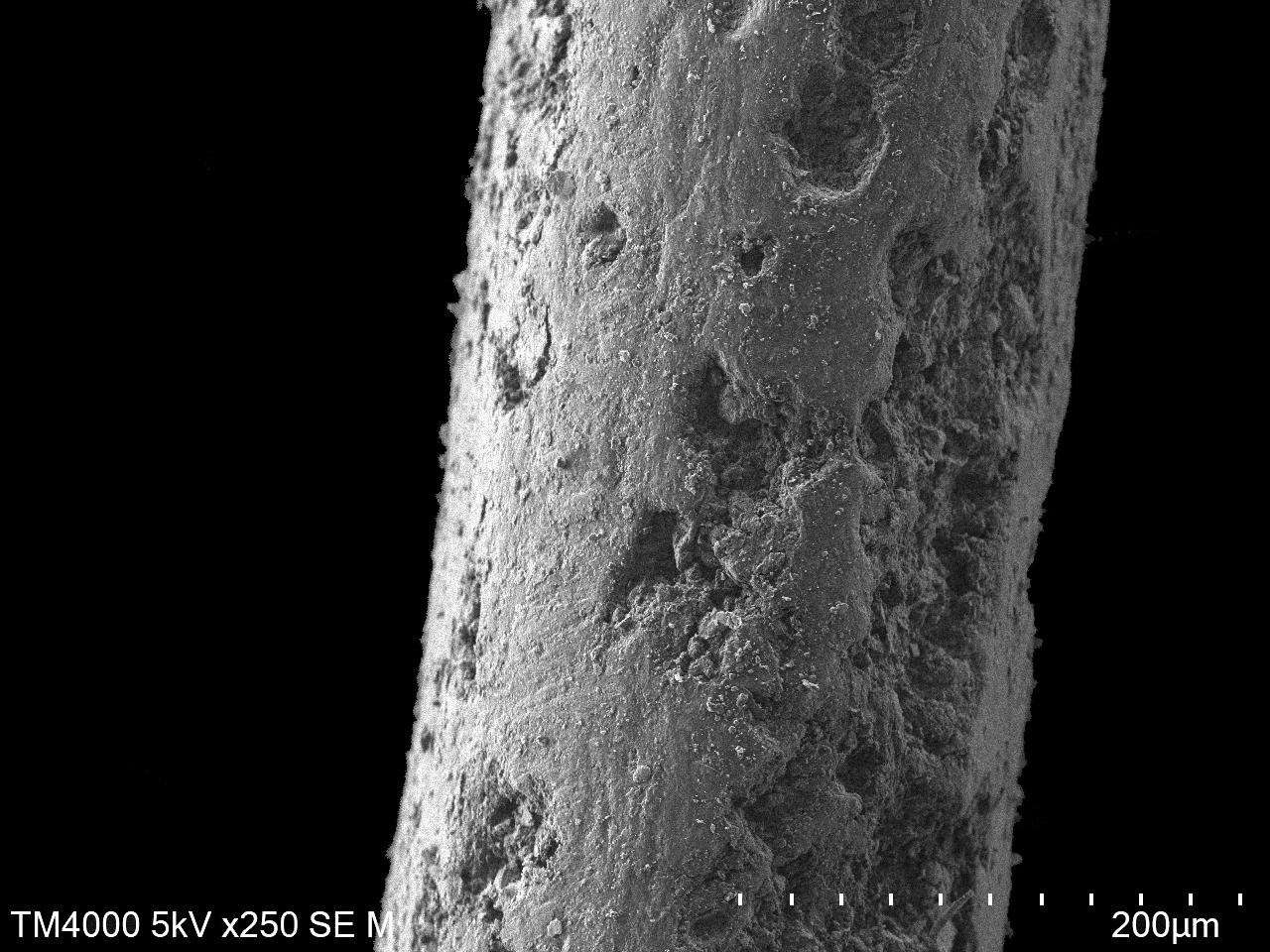
Fur in Naturhistorisches Museum, Vienna (left), and SEM magnified image of an overhair

The coat consisted of an outer layer of long, coarse "guard hair", which was 30 cm (12 in) on the upper part of the body, up to 90 cm (35 in) in length on the flanks and underside, and 0.5 mm (0.020 in) in diameter, and a denser inner layer of shorter, slightly curly under-wool, up to 8 cm (3.1 in) long and 0.05 mm (0.0020 in) in diameter. The hairs on the upper leg were up to 38 cm (15 in) long, and those of the feet were 15 cm (5.9 in) long, reaching the toes. The hairs on the head were relatively short, but longer on the underside and the sides of the trunk. The tail was extended by coarse hairs up to 60 cm (24 in) long, which were thicker than the guard hairs. The woolly mammoth likely moulted seasonally, and the heaviest fur was shed during spring.

Since mammoth carcasses were more likely to be preserved, possibly only the winter coat has been preserved in frozen specimens. Modern elephants have much less hair, though juveniles have a more extensive covering of hair than adults. This is thought to be for thermoregulation, helping them lose heat in their hot environments. Comparison between the over-hairs of woolly mammoths and extant elephants show that they did not differ much in overall morphology. Woolly mammoths had numerous sebaceous glands in their skin, which secreted oils into their hair; this would have improved the wool's insulation, repelled water, and given the fur a glossy sheen.

Preserved woolly mammoth fur is orange-brown, but this is believed to be an artefact from the bleaching of pigment during burial. The amount of pigmentation varied from hair to hair and within each hair. A 2006 study sequenced the Mc1r gene (which influences hair colour in mammals) from woolly mammoth bones. Two alleles were found: a dominant (fully active) and a recessive (partially active) one. In mammals, recessive Mc1r alleles result in light hair. Mammoths born with at least one copy of the dominant allele would have had dark coats, while those with two copies of the recessive allele would have had light coats. A 2011 study showed that light individuals would have been rare. A 2014 study instead indicated that the colouration of an individual varied from nonpigmented on the overhairs, bicoloured, nonpigmented and mixed red-brown guard hairs, and nonpigmented underhairs, which would give a light overall appearance.

=== Dentition ===
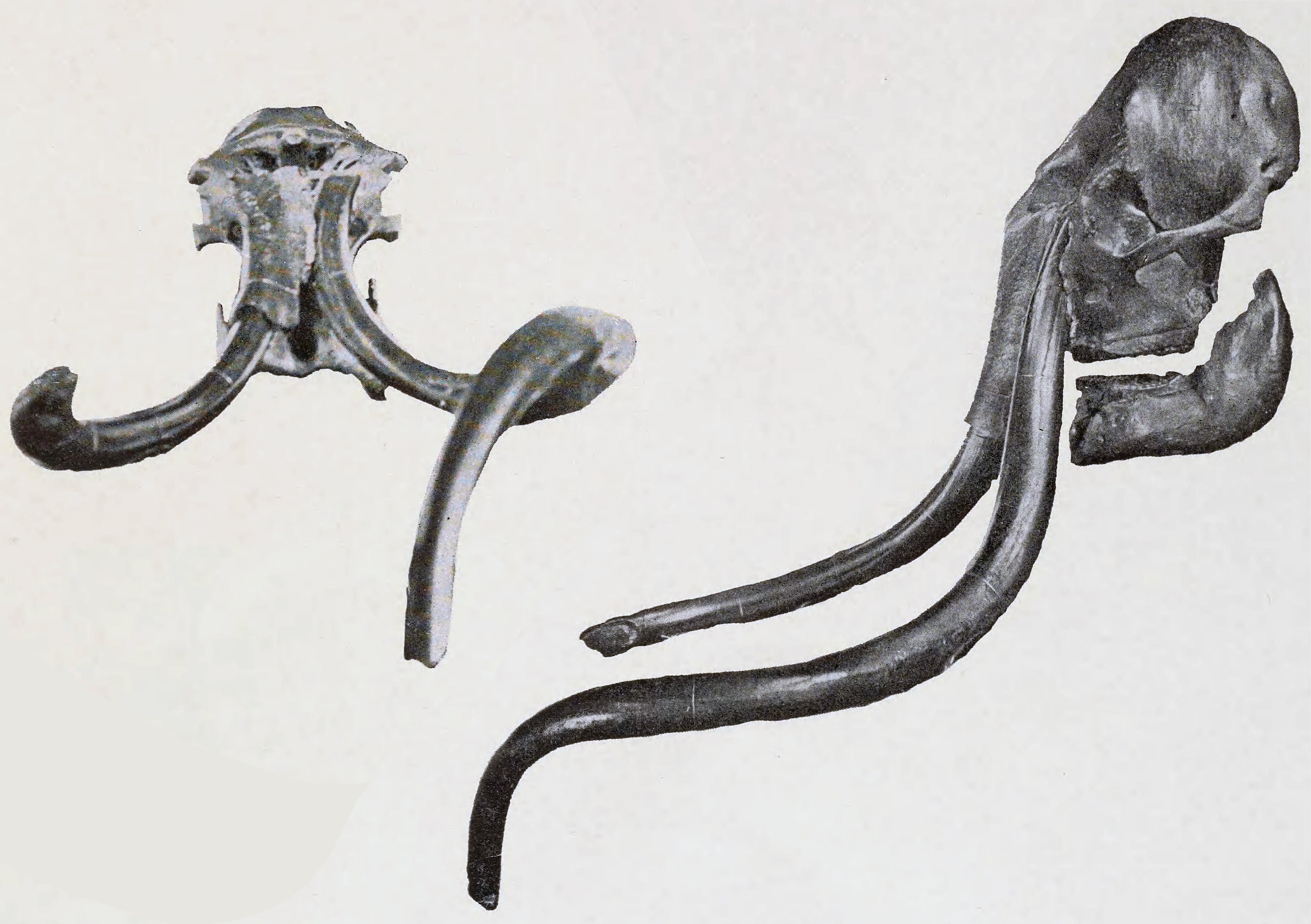
Skull from Poland with one broken and one downward spiralled tusk

Woolly mammoths had very long tusks (modified incisor teeth), which were more curved than those of modern elephants. The longest known male tusk is 4.05 m (13.3 ft) long (measured along the outside curve) and weighs 115.5 kg (255 lb), with an anecdotal historical report from the 1990s of a 4.3 m (14 ft) long tusk found in Chukotka, far eastern Siberia, while the heaviest tusk is 121 kg (267 lb), suggested to have been 125–130 kg (276–287 lb) when complete; 2.4–2.7 m (7 ft 10 in – 8 ft 10 in) and 45 kg (99 lb) was a more typical size. Female tusks were smaller and thinner, 1.5–1.8 m (4 ft 11 in – 5 ft 11 in) and weighing 9 kg (20 lb). For comparison, the record for longest tusks of the African bush elephant is 3.4 m (11 ft). The sheaths of the tusks were parallel and spaced closely. About a quarter of the length was inside the sockets. The tusks grew spirally in opposite directions from the base and continued in a curve until the tips pointed towards each other, sometimes crossing. In this way, most of the weight would have been close to the skull, and less torque would occur than with straight tusks.

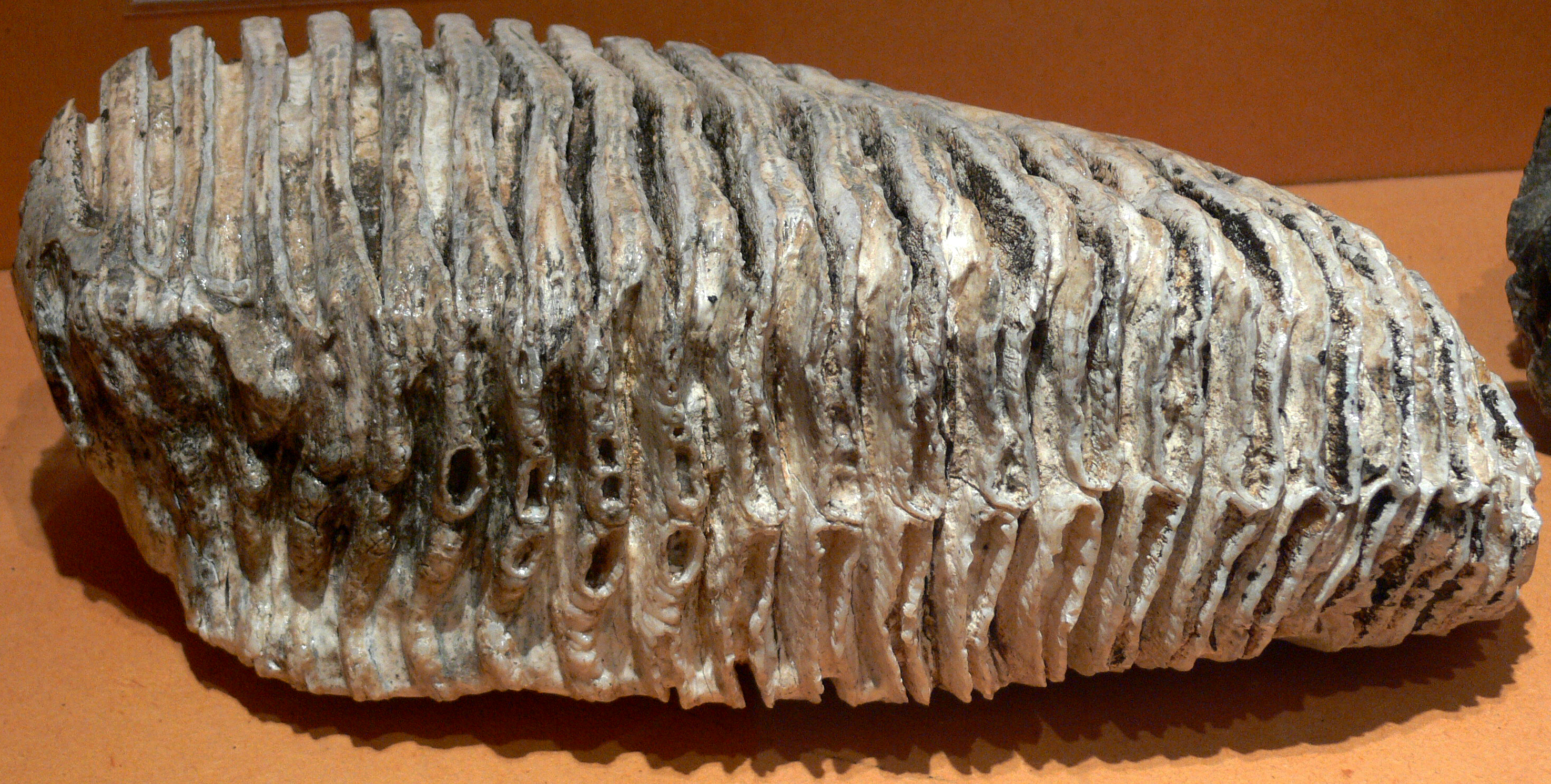
Molar from Font de Champdamoy, France, Musée Georges-Garret (above), and diagram of the upper (occlusal) surface of a molar

The tusks were usually asymmetrical and showed considerable variation, with some tusks curving down instead of outwards and some being shorter due to breakage. Calves developed small milk tusks a few centimetres long at six months old, which were replaced by permanent tusks a year later. Tusk growth continued throughout life, but became slower as the animal reached adulthood. The tusks grew by 2.5–15 cm (0.98–5.91 in) each year. Some cave paintings show woolly mammoths with small or no tusks, but whether this reflected reality or was artistic license is unknown. Female Asian elephants have no tusks, but no fossil evidence indicates that any adult woolly mammoths lacked them.

Woolly mammoths had four functional molar teeth at a time—two in the upper jaw and two in the lower. About 23 cm (9.1 in) of the crown was within the jaw, and 2.5 cm (0.98 in) was above. The crown was continually pushed forwards and up as it wore down, comparable to a conveyor belt. The teeth had up to 26 separated ridges of enamel, which were themselves covered in "prisms" that were directed towards the chewing surface. These were quite wear-resistant and kept together by cementum and dentine. A mammoth had six sets of molars throughout a lifetime, which were replaced five times, though a few specimens with a seventh set are known. The latter condition could extend the lifespan of the individual, unless the tooth consisted of only a few plates. The first molars were about the size of those of a human, 1.3 cm (0.51 in), the third were 15 cm (5.9 in) long, and the sixth were about 30 cm (12 in) long and weighed 1.8 kg (4.0 lb). The molars grew larger and contained more ridges with each replacement. Also, the functional area of their molars increased in concert with their overall body mass as they grew early on in their life history, but it later sharply declined as they aged and reached senility. The woolly mammoth is considered to have had the most complex molars of any elephant.

== Palaeobiology ==
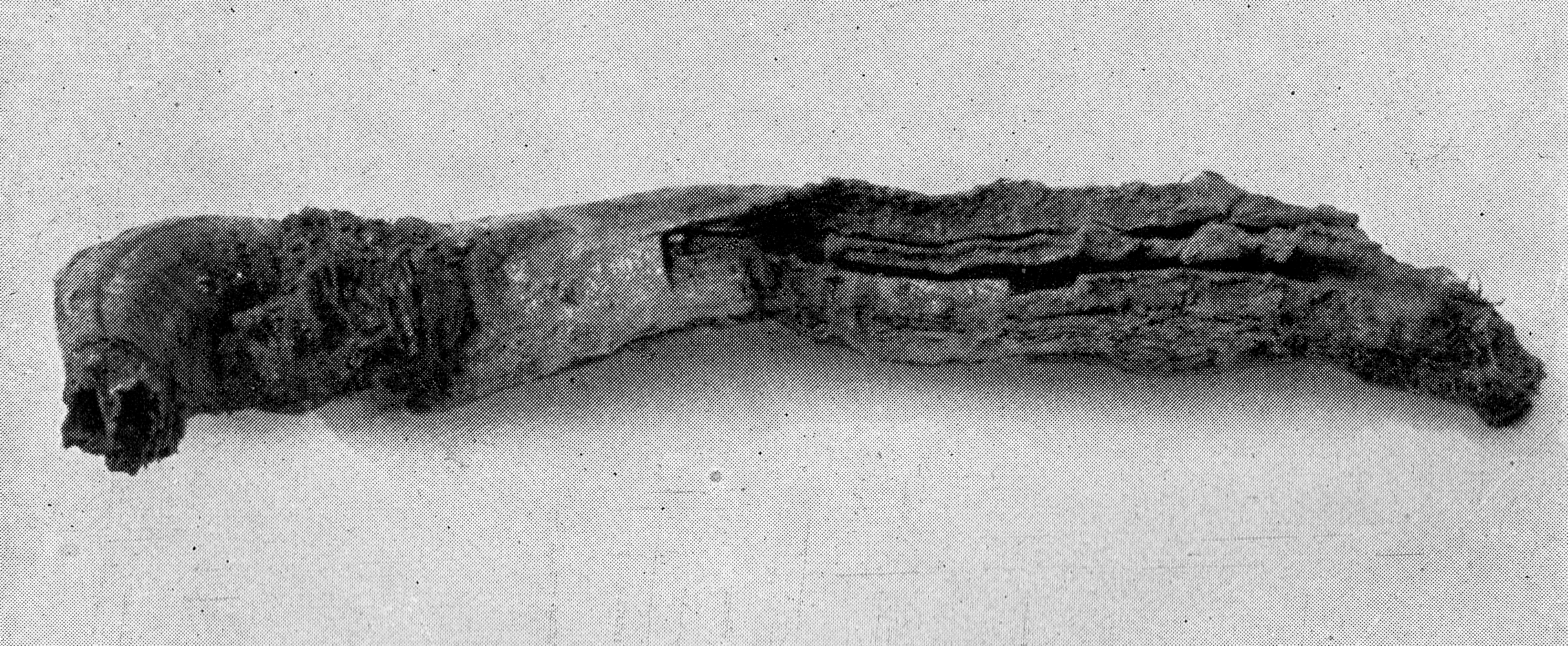
Trunk of the Sanga-Yuryakh mammoth

Adult woolly mammoths could effectively defend themselves from predators with their tusks, trunks, and size; however, juveniles and weakened adults were vulnerable to pack hunters such as wolves, cave hyenas, and large felines. The tusks may have been used in intraspecies fighting, such as fights over territory or mates. Display of the large tusks of males could have been used to attract females and intimidate rivals. Because of their curvature, the tusks were unsuitable for stabbing but may have been used for hitting, as indicated by injuries to some fossil shoulder blades.

The very long hairs on the tail probably compensated for the shortness of the tail, enabling its use as a flyswatter, similar to the tail on modern elephants. As in modern elephants, the sensitive and muscular trunk worked as a limb-like organ with many functions. It was used for manipulating objects and in social interactions. The well-preserved foot of the adult male "Yukagir mammoth" shows that the soles of the feet contained many cracks that would have helped in gripping surfaces during locomotion. Like modern elephants, woolly mammoths walked on their toes and had large, fleshy pads behind the toes.

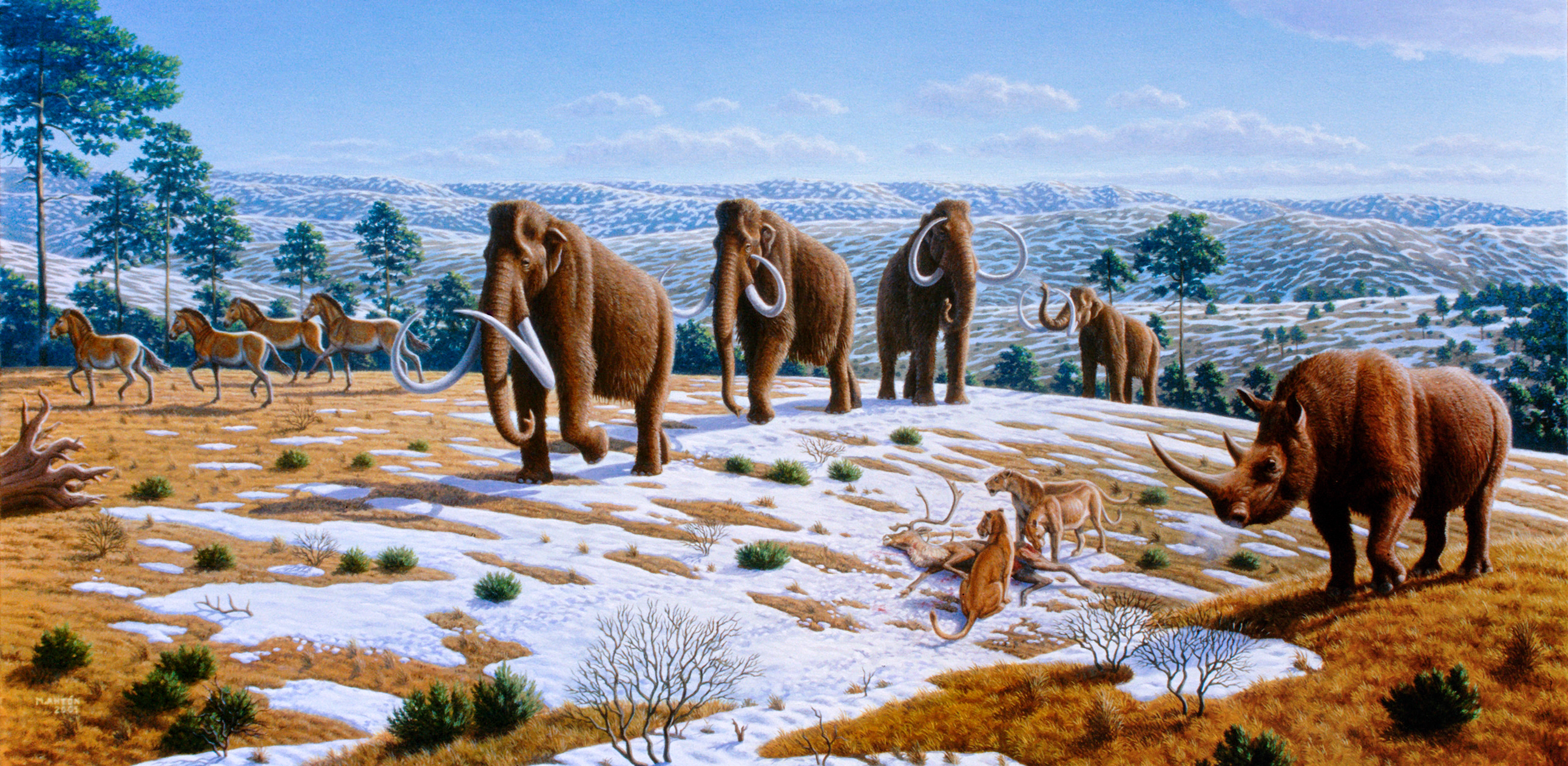
Life restoration of fauna during the Pleistocene epoch in northern Spain, by Mauricio Antón, 2004

Like modern elephants, woolly mammoths were likely very social and lived in matriarchal (female-led) family groups. This is supported by fossil assemblages and cave paintings showing groups, implying that most of their other social behaviours were likely similar to those of modern elephants. How many mammoths lived at one location at a time is unknown, as fossil deposits are often accumulations of individuals who died over long periods of time. The numbers likely varied by season and lifecycle events. Modern elephants can form large herds, sometimes consisting of multiple family groups, which can include thousands of animals migrating together. Mammoths may have formed large herds more often since animals that live in open areas are more likely to do this than those in forested areas. Trackways made by a woolly mammoth herd 11,300–11,000 years ago have been found in the St. Mary Reservoir in Canada, showing that in this case, almost equal numbers of adults, subadults, and juveniles were found. The adults had a stride of 2 m (6.6 ft), and the juveniles ran to keep up.

Woolly mammoth dental enamel from Poland has demonstrated that woolly mammoths were seasonally migratory. Recurring shifts in δ^{18}O and ^{87}Sr/^{86}Sr found in layers of the enamel correspond to seasonal variations and indicate that Polish woolly mammoths inhabited southern Poland during winter but grazed the Polish midlands during summer.

=== Adaptations to cold ===
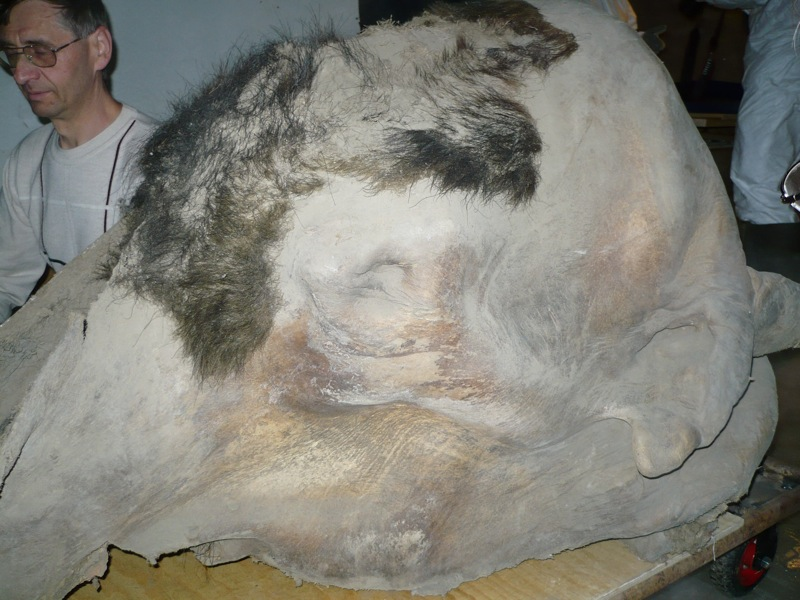
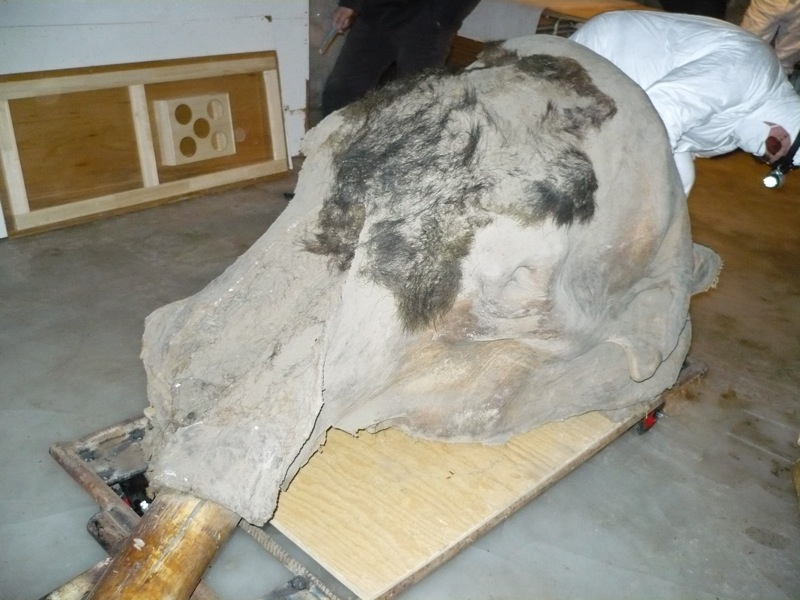
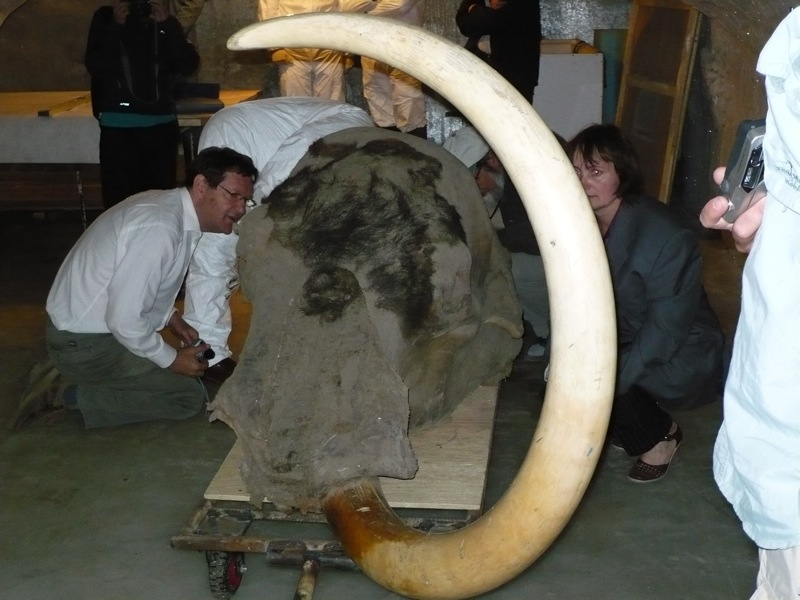
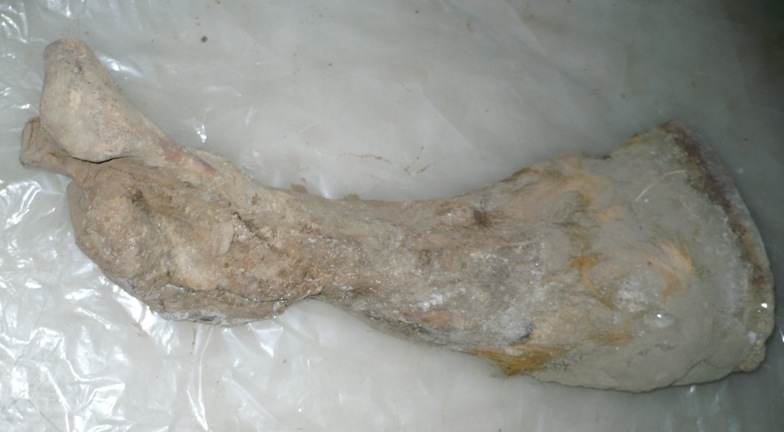
Head and leg of the adult male "Yukagir mammoth" (the trunk is not preserved); note fur and small ears

The woolly mammoth was probably the most specialised member of the family Elephantidae. In addition to their fur, they had lipoplexes (fat storage) in their neck and withers for times when food availability was insufficient during winter, and their first three molars grew more quickly than in the calves of modern elephants. The expansion identified on the trunk of "Yuka" and other specimens was suggested to function as a "fur mitten"; the trunk tip was not covered in fur but was used for foraging during winter and could have been heated by curling it into the expansion. The expansion could be used to melt snow if a shortage of water to drink existed, as melting it directly inside the mouth could disturb the thermal balance of the animal. As in reindeer and musk oxen, the haemoglobin of the woolly mammoth was adapted to the cold, with three mutations to improve oxygen delivery around the body and prevent freezing. This feature may have helped the mammoths to live at high latitudes.

In a 2015 study, high-quality genome sequences from three Asian elephants and two woolly mammoths were compared. About 1.4 million DNA nucleotide differences were found between mammoths and elephants, which affect the sequence of more than 1,600 proteins. Differences were noted in genes for a number of aspects of physiology and biology that would be relevant to Arctic survival, including the development of skin and hair, storage and metabolism of adipose tissue, and perceiving temperature. Genes related to both sensing temperature and transmitting that sensation to the brain were altered. One of the heat-sensing genes encodes a protein, TRPV3, found in the skin, which affects hair growth. When inserted into human cells, the mammoth's version of the protein was found to be less sensitive to heat than the elephant's. This is consistent with a previous observation that mice lacking active TRPV3 are likely to spend more time in cooler cage locations than wild-type mice and have wavier hair. Several alterations in circadian clock genes were found, perhaps needed to cope with the extreme polar variation in the length of daylight. Similar mutations are known in other Arctic mammals, such as reindeer.

A 2019 study of the woolly mammoth mitogenome suggests that these had metabolic adaptations related to extreme environments. A genetic study from 2023 found that the woolly mammoth had already acquired a broad range of genes associated with the development of skin and hair, fat storage, metabolism, and the immune system by the time the species appeared and that these continued to evolve within the last 700,000 years, including a gene that resulted in mammoths of the Late Quaternary having small ears.

=== Diet ===
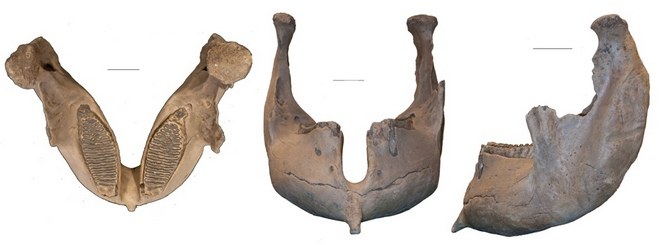
Lower jaw from the top, front and side, from Ram, Serbia

Food at various stages of digestion has been found in the intestines of several woolly mammoths, giving a good picture of their diet. Woolly mammoths sustained themselves on plant food, such as forbs, grasses and sedges, which were supplemented with herbaceous plants, flowering plants, shrubs, mosses, and tree matter. The composition and exact varieties differed from location to location. Woolly mammoths needed a varied diet to support their growth, similar to modern elephants. A 2014 study examined coprolites (fossil dung) of woolly mammoths and other Ice Age mammals and found they consisted of about 63% forbs, and about 27% grasses. Coupled with other methods, these researchers concluded that the Arctic was dominated by forbs much of the last 50,000 years instead of grasses, as was long thought. Only from 10,000 years ago did forbs decline and woody plants and grasses became predominant.

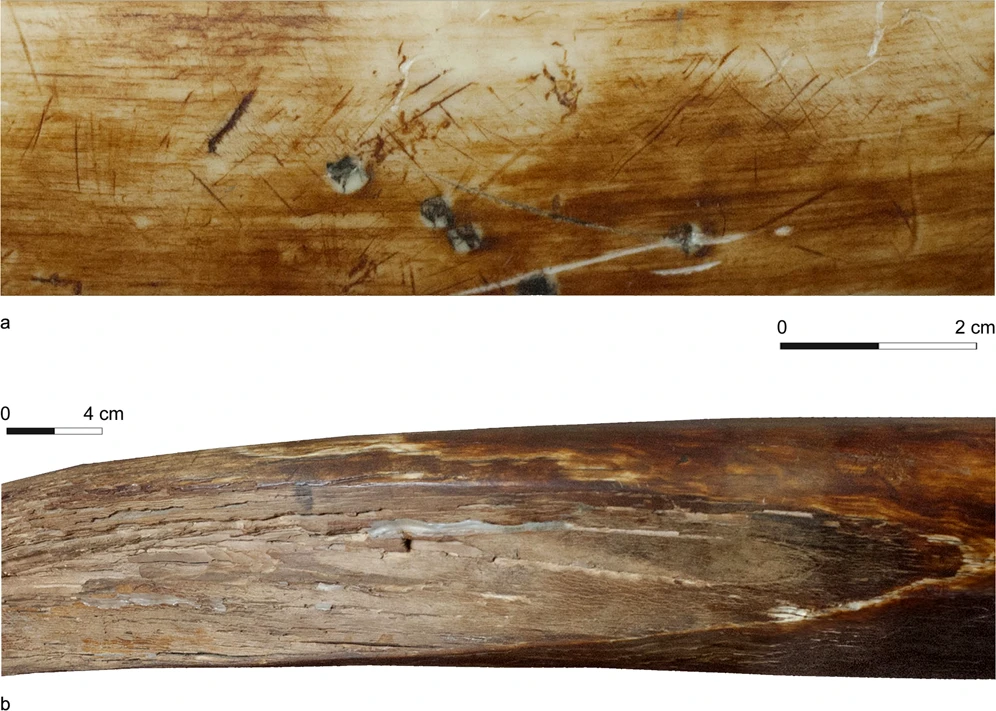
Male tusk with signs of wear

An adult of 6 tonnes would need to eat 180 kg (400 lb) daily and may have foraged as long as 20 hours every day. The two-fingered tip of the trunk was probably adapted for picking up the short plants of the last ice age (Quaternary glaciation, 2.58 million years ago to present) by wrapping around them. In contrast, modern elephants curl their trunks around the longer grass of their tropical environments. The trunk could be used for pulling off large grass tufts, delicately picking buds and flowers, and tearing off leaves and branches where trees and shrubs were present. The "Yukagir mammoth" had ingested plant matter that contained spores of dung fungus. Isotope analysis shows that woolly mammoths fed mainly on C_{3} plants, unlike horses and rhinos. Dental microwear of woolly mammoths indicates that they were predominantly grazers, though with some populations being exceptions to this trend.

Scientists identified milk in the stomach and faecal matter in the intestines of the mammoth calf "Lyuba". The faecal matter may have been eaten by "Lyuba" to promote development of the intestinal microbes necessary for digestion of vegetation, as is the case in modern elephants. An isotope analysis of woolly mammoths from Yukon showed that the young nursed for at least 3 years and were weaned and gradually changed to a diet of plants when they were 2–3 years old. This is later than in modern elephants and may be due to a higher risk of predator attack or difficulty obtaining food during the long winter darkness at high latitudes.

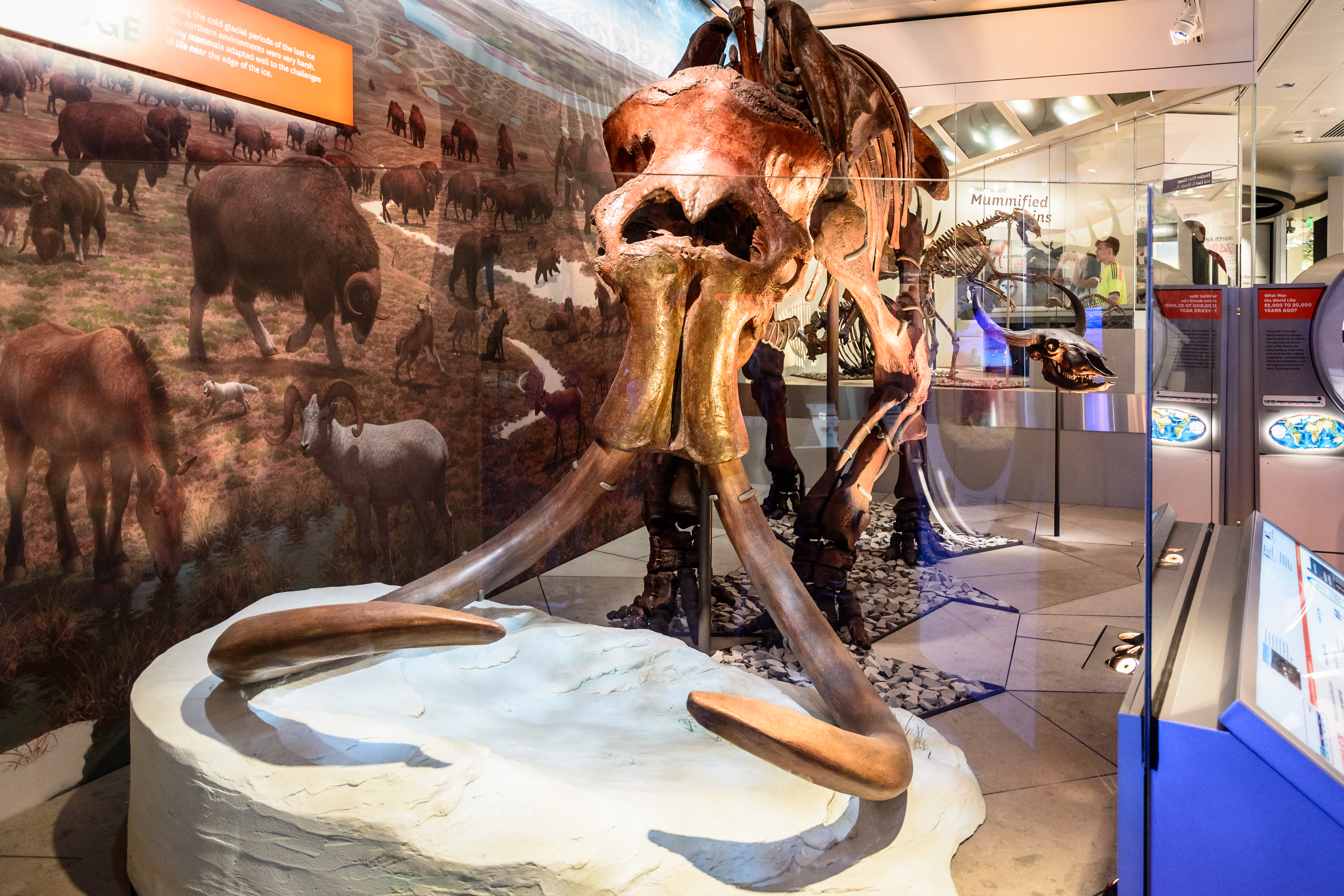
Skeleton mounted as if using its tusks to dig, Smithsonian Museum of Natural History

The molars were adapted to their diet of coarse tundra vegetation, with more enamel plates and a higher crown than their earlier southern relatives. The woolly mammoth chewed its food using its powerful jaw muscles to move the mandible forwards and close the mouth, then backward while opening; the sharp enamel ridges cut across each other, grinding the food. The ridges were wear-resistant, enabling the animal to chew large quantities of food, often containing grit. Woolly mammoths may have used their tusks as shovels to clear snow from the ground, reach the vegetation buried below, and break ice to drink. This is indicated on many preserved tusks by flat, polished sections up to 30 cm (12 in) long, as well as scratches on the part of the surface that would have reached the ground (especially at their outer curvature). The tusks were used for obtaining food in other ways, such as digging up plants and stripping off bark.

=== Life history ===
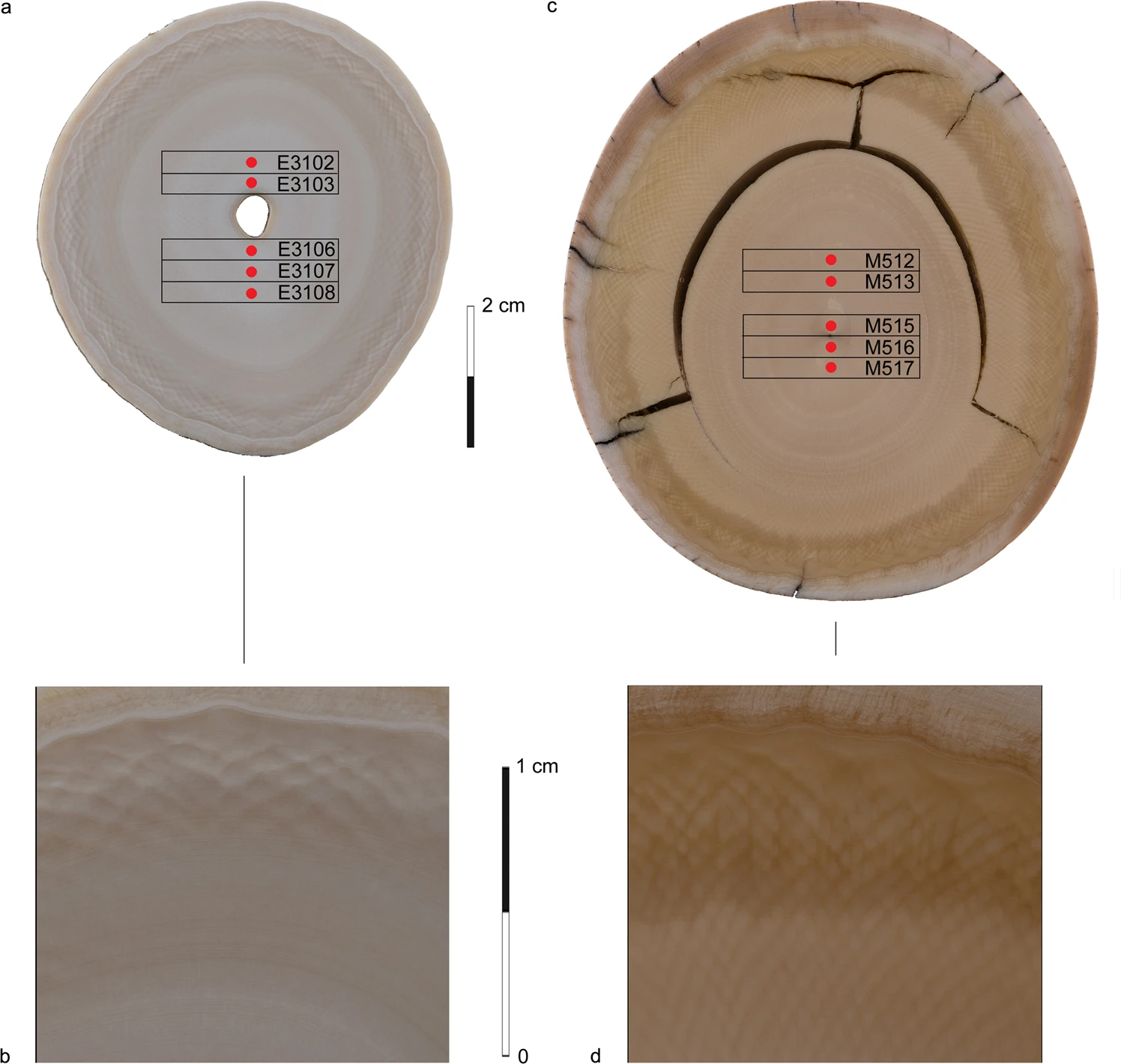
Cross sections of African elephant and woolly mammoth tusks; growth rings can be used to determine age

The lifespan of mammals is related to their size. Since modern elephants can reach the age of 60 years, the same is thought to be true for woolly mammoths, which were of a similar size. The age of a mammoth can be roughly determined by counting the growth rings of its tusks when viewed in cross-section, but this does not account for its early years, as these are represented by the tips of the tusks, which are usually worn away. In the remaining part of the tusk, each major line represents a year, and weekly and daily ones can be found in between. Dark bands correspond to summers, so determining the season in which a mammoth died is possible. The growth of the tusks slowed when foraging became harder, for example, during winter, during disease, or when a male was banished from the herd (male elephants live with their herds until about the age of 10). Mammoth tusks dating to the harshest period of the last glaciation 25–20,000 years ago show slower growth rates.

Woolly mammoths continued growing past adulthood, like other elephants. Unfused limb bones show that males grew until they reached the age of 40, and females grew until they were 25. The frozen calf "Dima" was 90 cm (35 in) tall when it died at the age of 6–12 months. At this age, the second set of molars would erupt, and the first set would be worn out at 18 months of age. The third set of molars lasted for 10 years, and this process was repeated until the final, sixth set emerged when the animal was 30 years old. When the last set of molars was worn out, the animal would be unable to chew and feed, and it would die of starvation. A study of North American mammoths found that they often died during winter or spring, the hardest times for northern animals to survive. Unlike other elephants, the woolly mammoth is thought to have reached sexual maturity at 18–20 years of age.

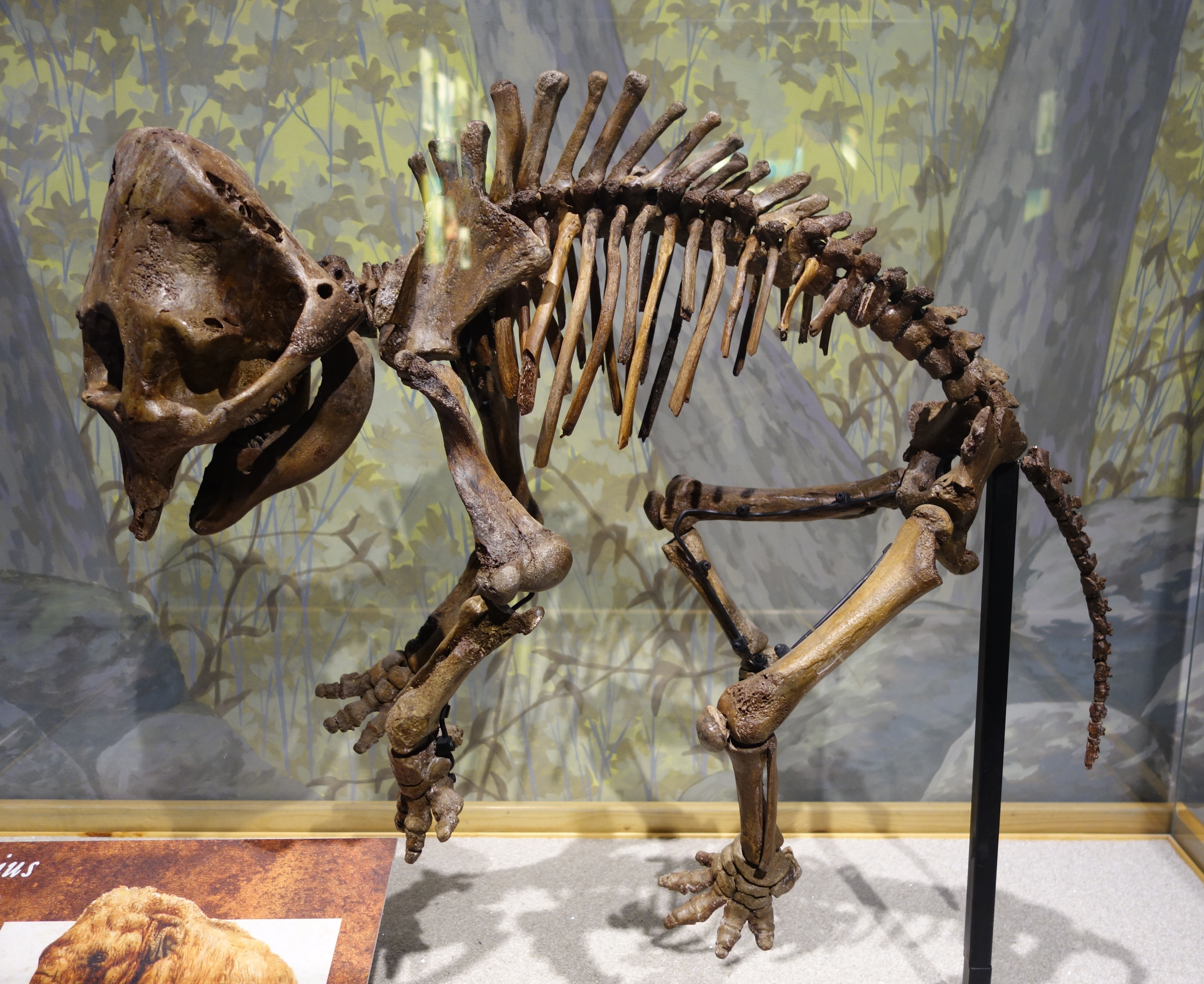
Skeleton of a calf less than a year old from Siberia, Museum of Ancient Life

Examination of preserved calves shows that they were all born during spring and summer, and since modern elephants have gestation periods of 21–22 months, the mating season probably was from summer to autumn. δ15N isotopic analysis of the teeth of "Lyuba" has demonstrated their prenatal development and indicates its gestation period was similar to that of a modern elephant and that it was born in spring.

The best-preserved head of a frozen adult specimen, that of a male nicknamed the "Yukagir mammoth", shows that woolly mammoths had temporal glands between the ear and the eye. This feature indicates that, like bull elephants, male woolly mammoths entered "musth", a period of heightened aggressiveness. The glands are used especially by males to produce an oily substance with a strong smell called temporin. Their fur may have helped spread the scent further. This was confirmed by a 2023 study that compared the testosterone level in the dentine of an adult African elephant tusk with that of a male woolly mammoth.

=== Palaeopathology ===
Evidence of several different bone diseases has been found in woolly mammoths. The most common of these was osteoarthritis, found in 2% of specimens. One specimen from Switzerland had several fused vertebrae due to this condition. The "Yukagir mammoth" had suffered from spondylitis in two vertebrae, and osteomyelitis is known from some specimens. Several specimens have healed bone fractures, showing that the animals had survived these injuries. Likewise, spondyloarthropathy has also been identified in woolly mammoth remains. An extra number of cervical vertebrae has been found in 33% of specimens from the North Sea region, probably due to a drop in numbers and subsequent inbreeding. Vertebral lesions in woolly mammoths have been speculated to have resulted from nutritional stress. Woolly mammoth ribs have also been shown to contain pathologies, including healed fractures and osteoporosis. Parasitic flies and protozoa were identified in the gut of the calf "Dima".

Distortion in the molars is the most common health problem found in woolly mammoth fossils. Sometimes, the replacement was disrupted, and the molars were pushed into abnormal positions, but some animals are known to have survived this. Teeth from Britain showed that 2% of specimens had periodontal disease, with half of these containing caries. The teeth sometimes had cancerous growths.

== Distribution and habitat ==
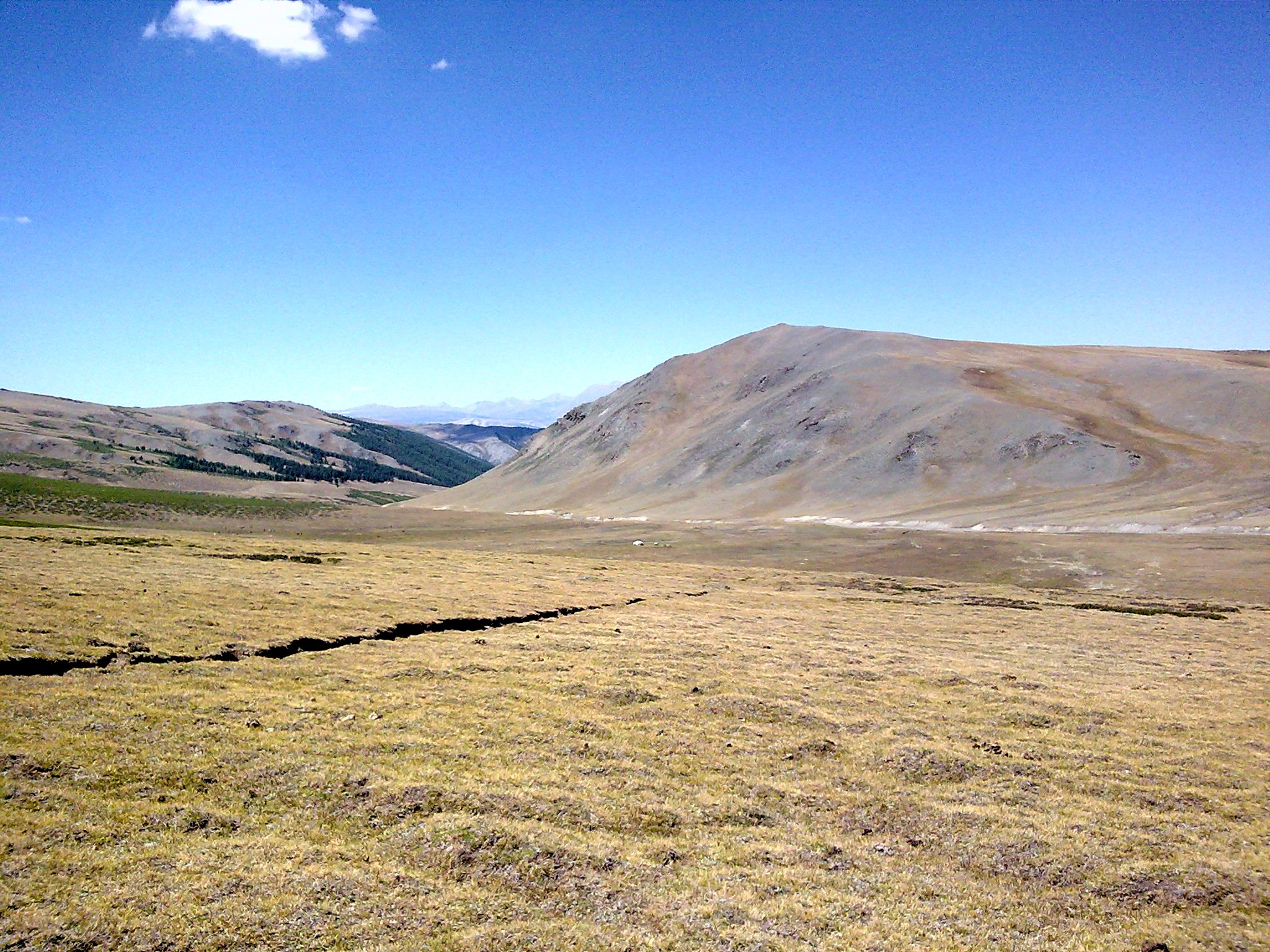
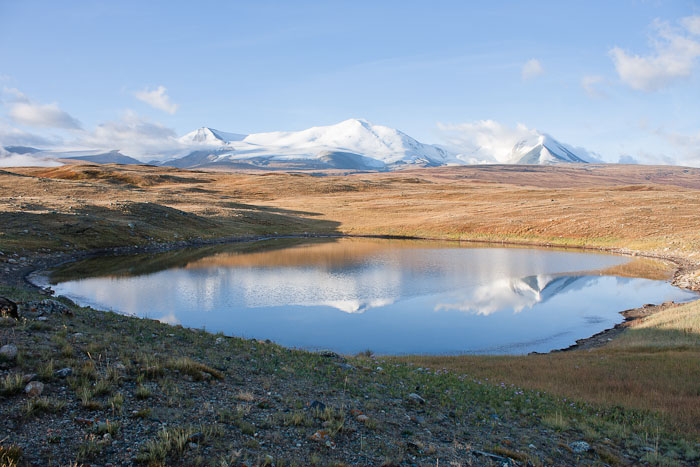
The Altai-Sayan assemblages, such as Khar-Us Nuur and Ukok-Sailiugem, are similar to the "mammoth steppe"

The habitat of the woolly mammoth is known as "mammoth steppe" or "tundra steppe". This environment stretched across northern Asia, many parts of Europe, and the northern part of North America during the last ice age. It was similar to the grassy steppes of modern Russia, but the flora was more diverse, abundant, and grew faster. Grasses, sedges, shrubs, and herbaceous plants were present, and scattered trees were mainly found in southern regions. This habitat was not dominated by ice and snow, as is popularly believed, since these regions are thought to have been high-pressure areas at the time. The habitat of the woolly mammoth supported other grazing herbivores such as the woolly rhinoceros, wild horses, and bison. The Altai-Sayan assemblages are the modern biomes most similar to the "mammoth steppe". A 2014 study concluded that forbs (a group of herbaceous plants) were more important in the steppe-tundra than previously acknowledged, and that it was a primary food source for the ice-age megafauna.

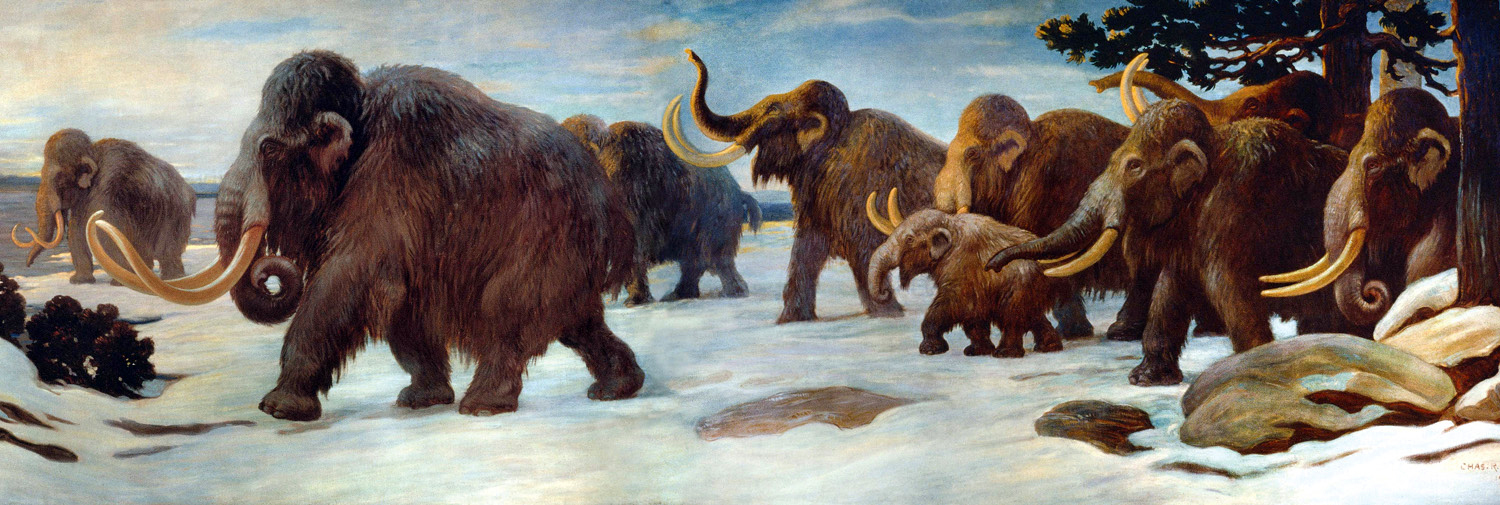
Mural depicting a herd walking near the Somme River in France, by Charles R. Knight, 1916

The southernmost woolly mammoth specimen known is from the Shandong province of China and is 33,000 years old. The southernmost European remains are from the Depression of Granada in Spain and are of roughly the same age. DNA studies have helped determine the phylogeography of the woolly mammoth. A 2008 DNA study showed two distinct groups of woolly mammoths: one that became extinct 45,000 years ago and another one that became extinct 12,000 years ago. The two groups are speculated to be divergent enough to be characterised as subspecies. The group that became extinct earlier stayed in the middle of the high Arctic, while the group with the later extinction had a much wider range. Recent stable isotope studies of Siberian and New World mammoths have shown there were differences in climatic conditions on either side of the Bering land bridge (Beringia), with Siberia being more uniformly cold and dry throughout the Late Pleistocene. During the Younger Dryas age, woolly mammoths briefly expanded into north-east Europe, whereafter the mainland populations became extinct.

A 2008 genetic study showed that some of the woolly mammoths that entered North America through the Bering land bridge from Asia migrated back about 300,000 years ago and had replaced the previous Asian population by about 40,000 years ago, not long before the entire species became extinct. Fossils of woolly mammoths and Columbian mammoths have been found together in a few localities of North America, including the Hot Springs sinkhole of South Dakota where their regions overlapped. It is unknown whether the two species were sympatric and lived there simultaneously, or if the woolly mammoths may have entered these southern areas during times when Columbian mammoth populations were absent there.

== Relationship with humans ==
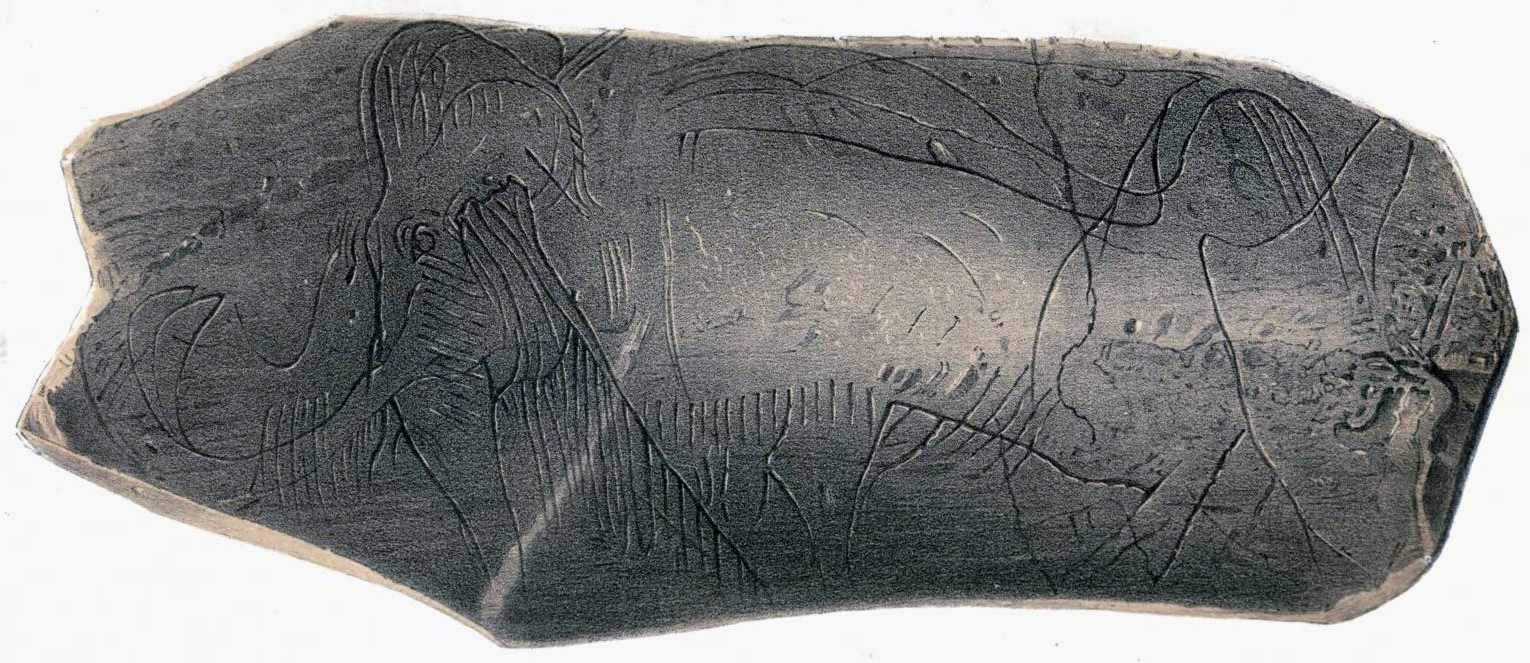
Woolly mammoth engraved on ivory found in 1864, the first known contemporary depiction of a prehistoric animal

Modern humans coexisted with woolly mammoths during the Upper Palaeolithic period when humans entered Europe from Africa between 30,000 and 40,000 years ago. Before this, Neanderthals had coexisted with mammoths during the Middle Palaeolithic (as evidenced by sites such as La Cotte de St Brelade in the Channel Islands, dating to 200,000 years ago), and already used mammoth bones for tool-making and building materials. Woolly mammoths were very important to ice age humans, and human survival may have depended on the mammoth in some areas. Evidence for such coexistence was not recognised until the 19th century. William Buckland published his discovery of the Red Lady of Paviland skeleton in 1823, which was found in a cave alongside woolly mammoth bones, but he mistakenly denied that these were contemporaries. In 1864, Édouard Lartet found an engraving of a woolly mammoth on a piece of mammoth ivory in the Abri de la Madeleine cave in Dordogne, France. The engraving was the first widely accepted evidence for the coexistence of humans with prehistoric extinct animals and is the first contemporary depiction of such a creature known to modern science.

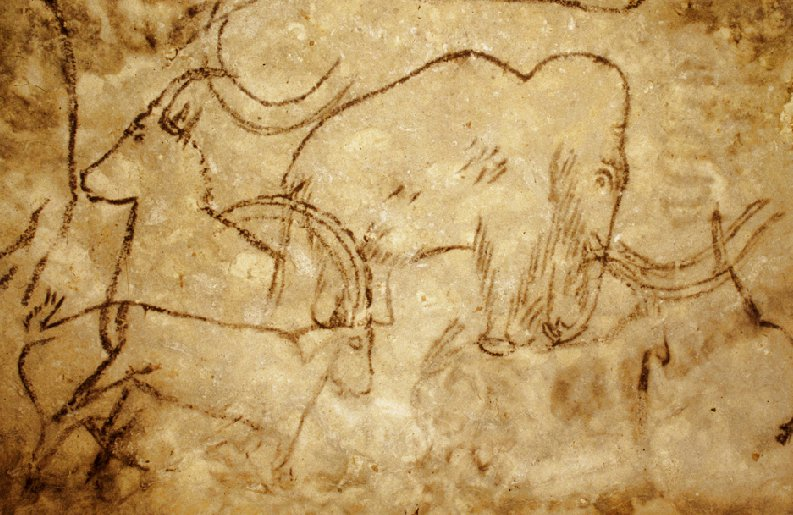
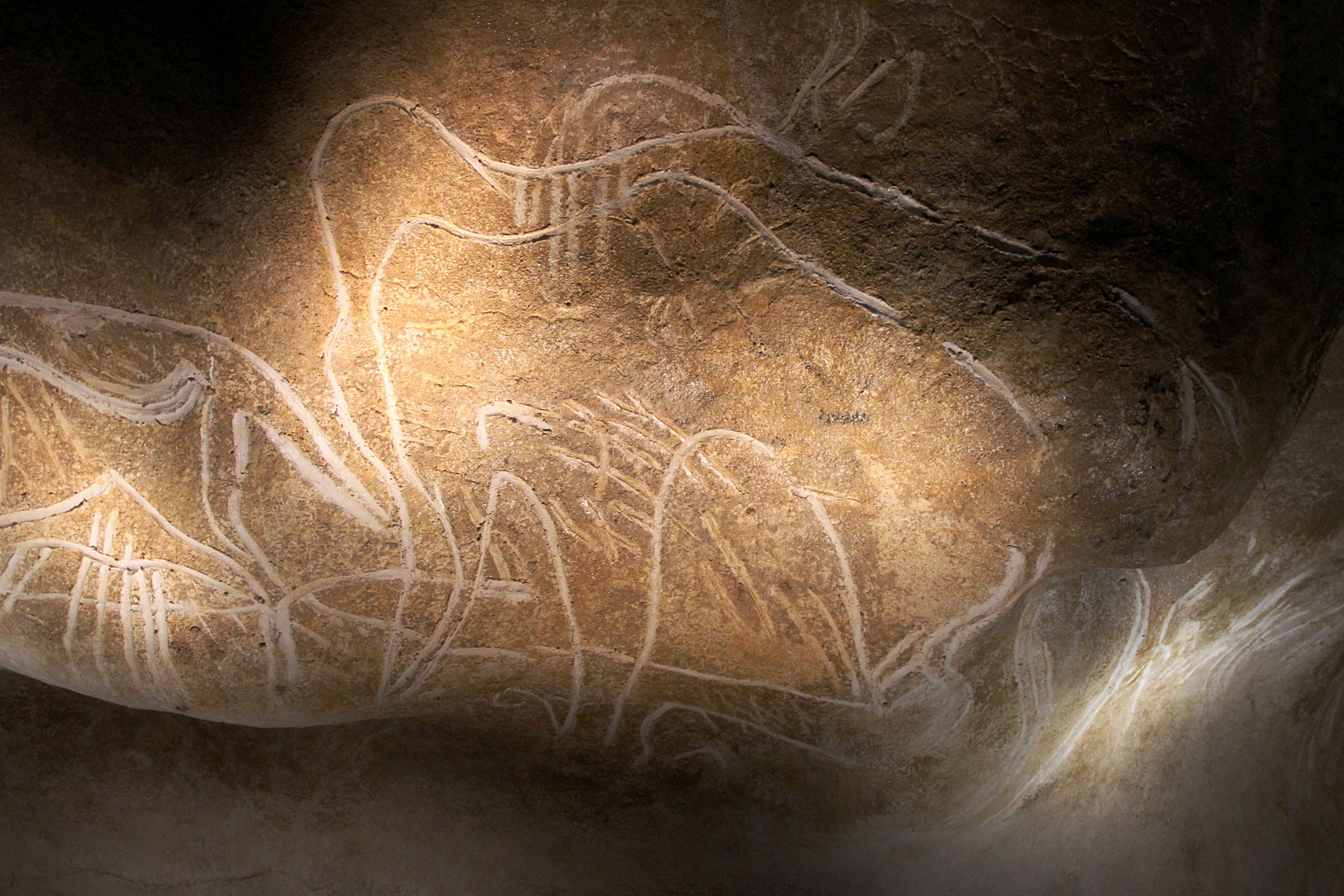
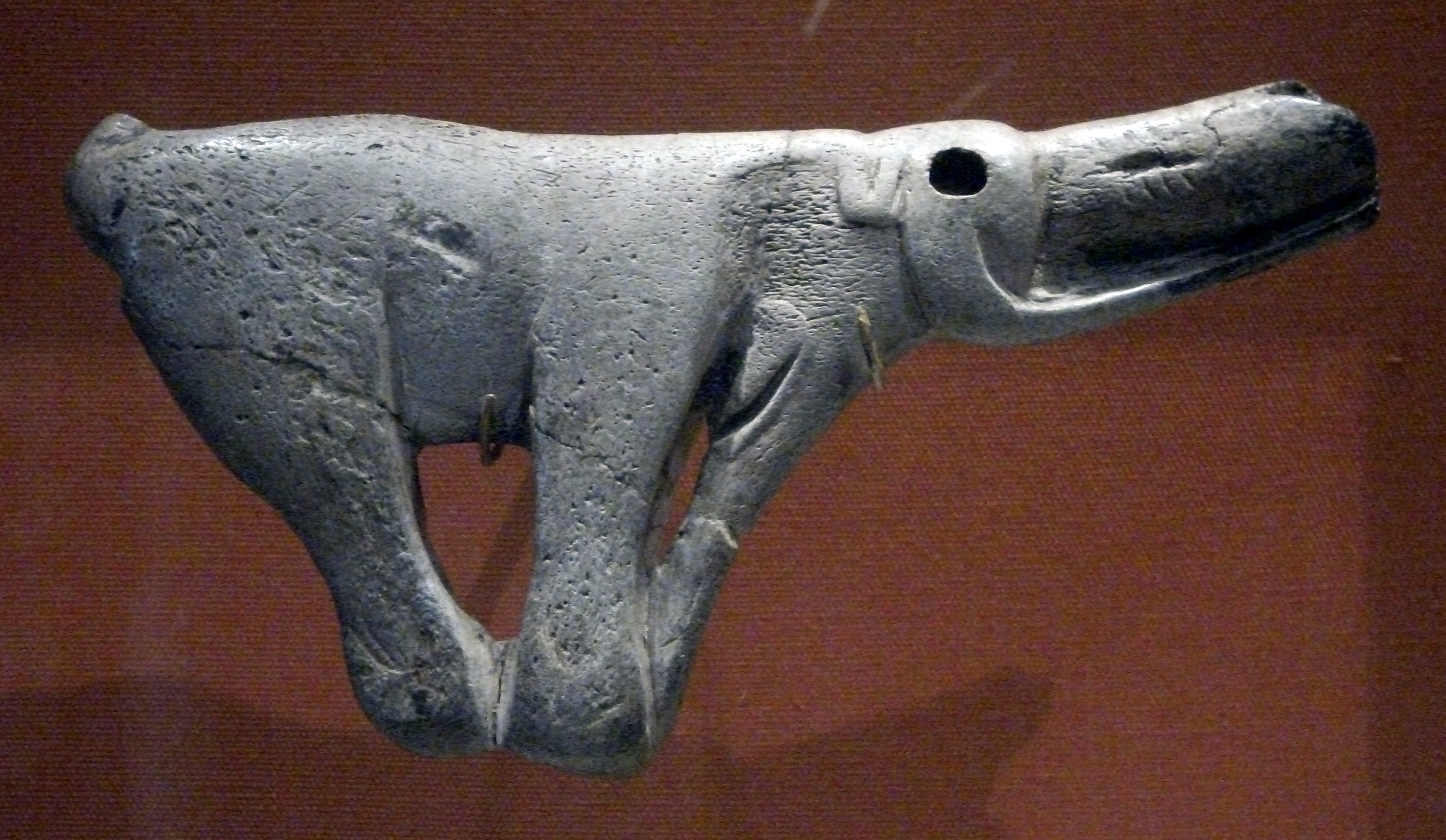
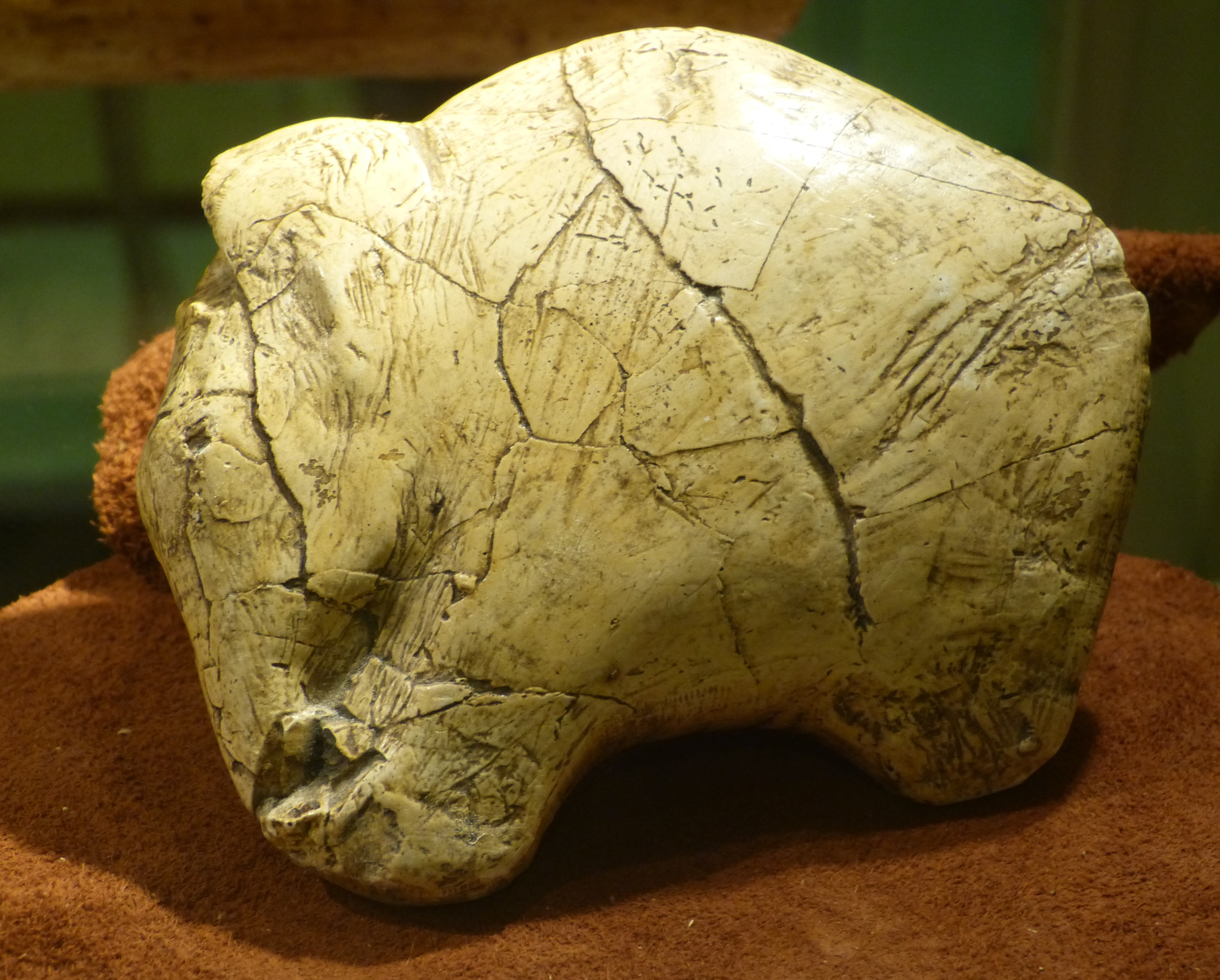
Various prehistoric depictions of woolly mammoths, including cave paintings (above) and sculptures

The woolly mammoth is the third-most depicted animal in ice age art, after horses and bison, and these images were produced between 35,000 and 11,500 years ago. Today, more than 500 depictions of woolly mammoths have been discovered in media ranging from cave paintings and engravings on the walls of 46 caves in Russia, France, and Spain to engravings and sculptures (termed "portable art") made from ivory, antler, stone, and bone. Cave paintings of woolly mammoths exist in several styles and sizes. The French Rouffignac Cave has the most depictions, 159, and some of the drawings are more than 2 m (6 ft 7 in) in length. Other notable caves with mammoth depictions are the Chauvet Cave, Les Combarelles Cave, and Font-de-Gaume. An elephantid depiction in the Cave of El Castillo may instead show the straight-tusked elephant (Palaeoloxodon antiquus).

"Portable art" can be more accurately dated than cave art since it is found in the same deposits as tools and other ice age artifacts. The largest collection of portable mammoth art, consisting of 62 depictions on 47 plaques, was found in the 1960s at an excavated open-air camp near Gönnersdorf in Germany. A correlation between the number of mammoths depicted and the most often hunted species does not seem to exist since reindeer bones are the most frequently found animal remains at the site. Two spear throwers shaped as woolly mammoths have been found in France. Some portable mammoth depictions may not have been produced where they were discovered but could have moved around by ancient trading.

=== Exploitation ===
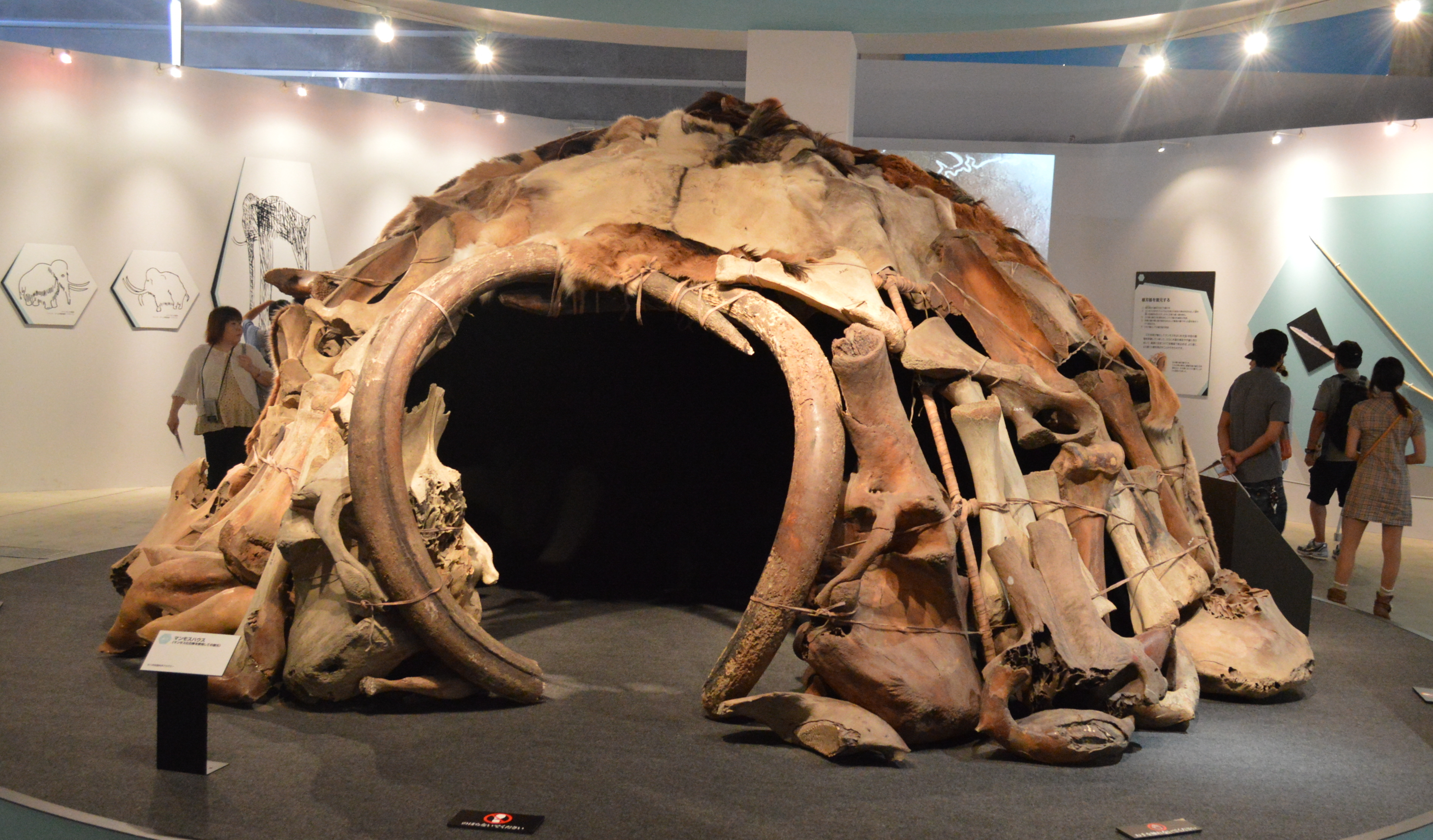
Reconstructed bone hut based on finds in Mezhyrich, exhibited in Japan

Woolly mammoth bones were used as construction material for dwellings by both Neanderthals and modern humans during the ice age. More than 70 such dwellings are known, mainly from the East European Plain. The huts' bases were circular, ranging from 8 to 24 m^{2} (86 to 258 sq ft). The arrangement of dwellings varied and ranged from 1 to 20 m (3.3 to 65.6 ft) apart, depending on location. Large bones were used as foundations for the huts, tusks for the entrances, and the roofs were probably skins held in place by bones or tusks. Some huts had floors that extended 40 cm (16 in) below ground. Some of the bones used for materials may have come from mammoths killed by humans, but the state of the bones and the fact that bones used to build a single dwelling varied by several thousands of years in age suggests that they were collected remains of long-dead animals. Woolly mammoth bones were made into various tools, furniture, and musical instruments. Large bones, such as shoulder blades, were used to cover dead human bodies during burial.

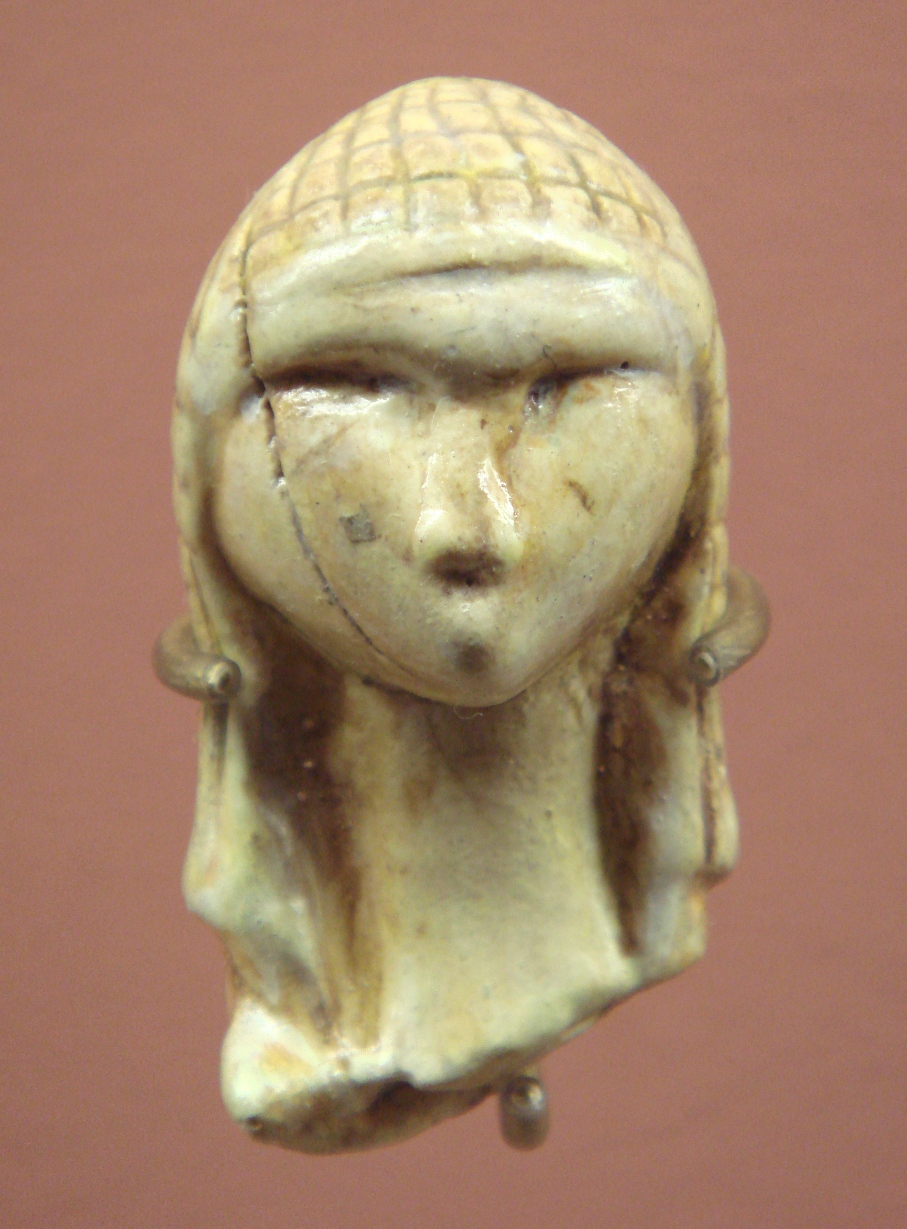
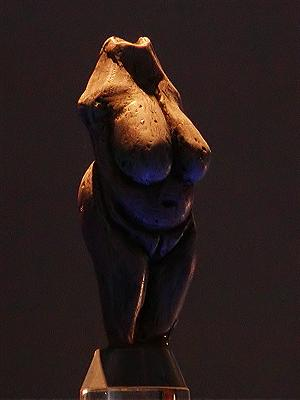
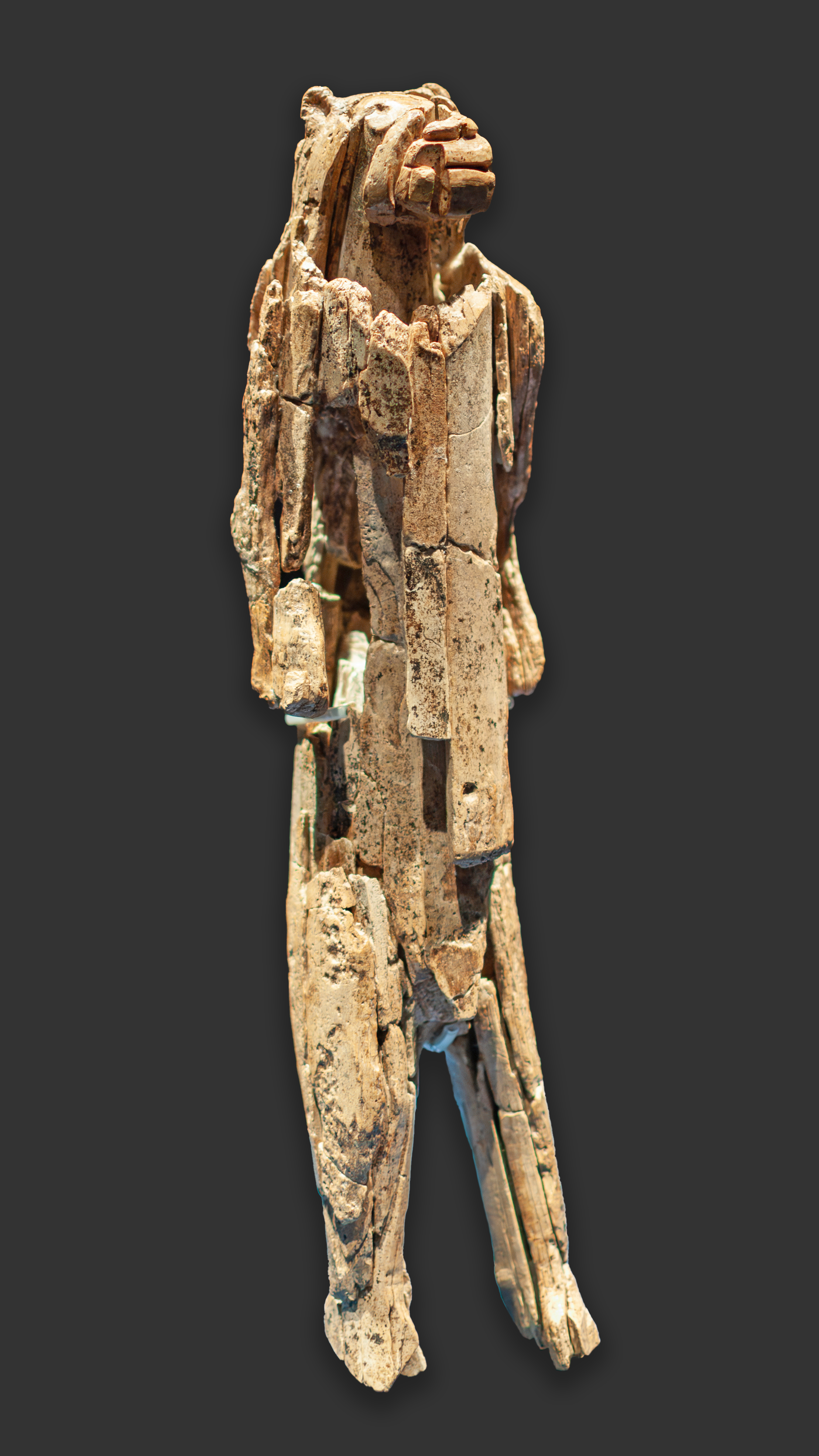
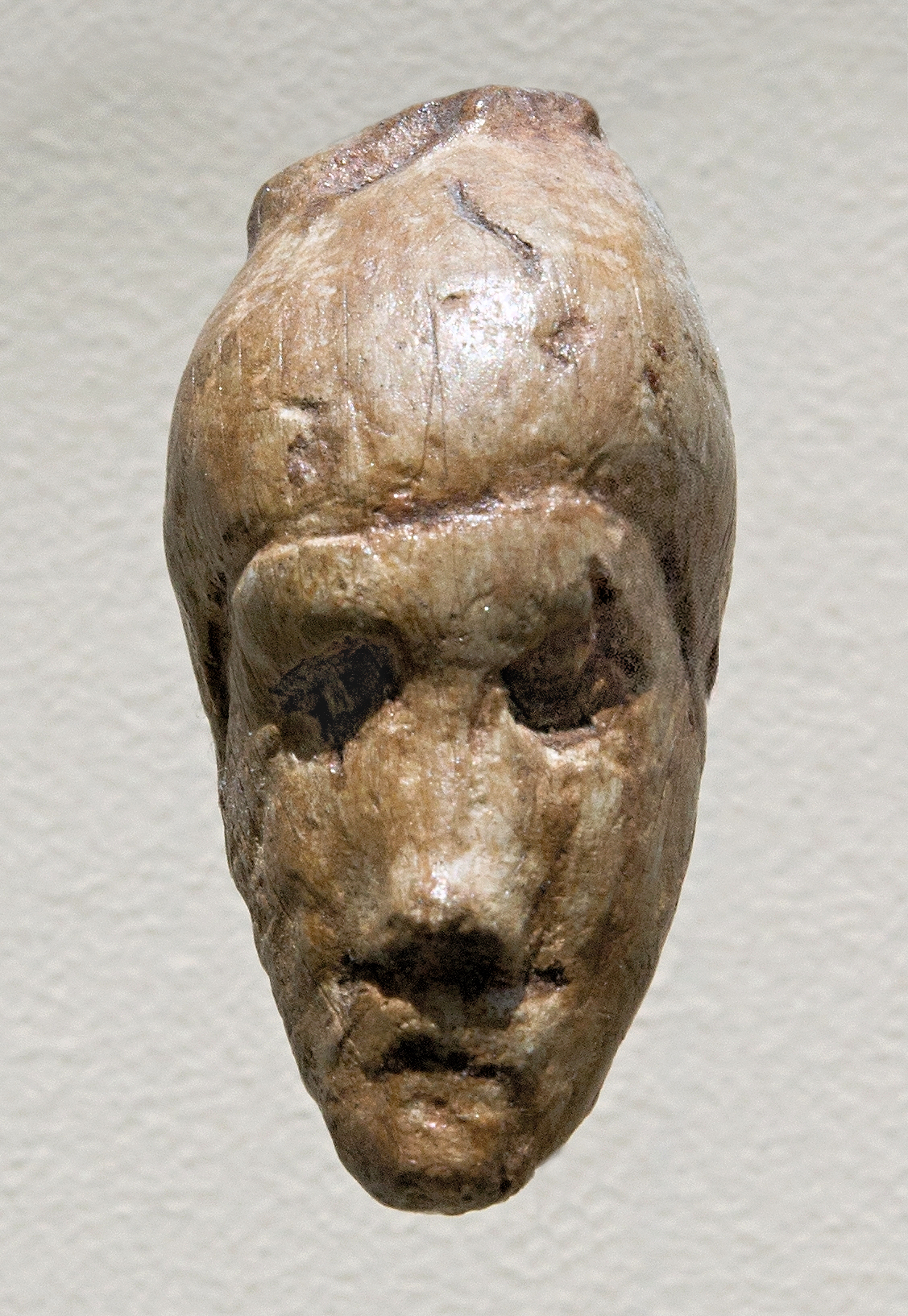
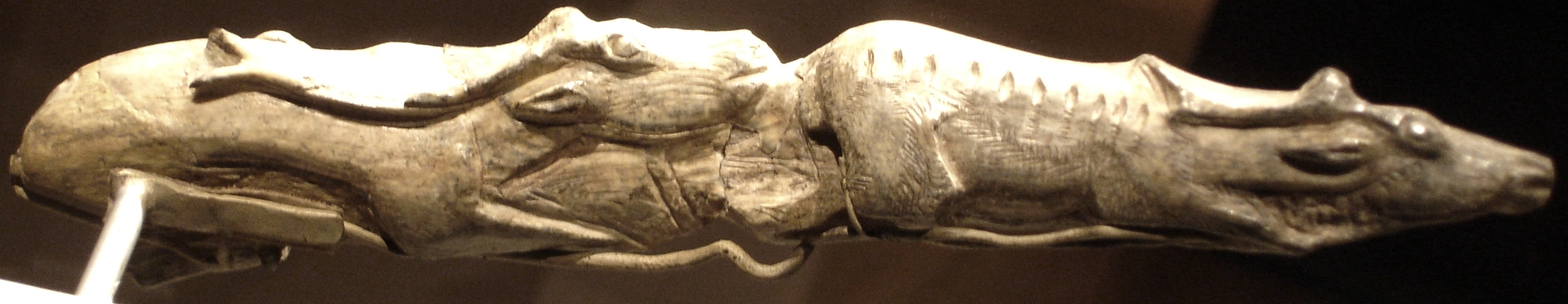
Artifacts made from woolly mammoth ivory; the Venus of Brassempouy, Venus of Moravany, Lion-man of Hohlenstein-Stadel, female face from Dolní Věstonice, and Swimming Reindeer

Woolly mammoth ivory was used to create art objects. Several Venus figurines, including the Venus of Brassempouy and the Venus of Lespugue, were made from this material. Weapons made from ivory, such as daggers, spears, and a boomerang, are known. A 2019 study found that woolly mammoth ivory was the most suitable bony material for producing big game projectile points during the Late Pleistocene. To process the ivory, the large tusks had to be chopped, chiselled, and split into smaller, more manageable pieces. Some ivory artifacts show that tusks had been straightened, and how this was achieved is unknown.

Woolly mammoths were an important food source for both modern humans and Neanderthals. Several woolly mammoth specimens show evidence of being butchered by humans, which is indicated by breaks, cut marks, and associated stone tools. How much prehistoric humans relied on woolly mammoth meat is unknown since many other large herbivores were available. Many mammoth carcasses may have been scavenged by humans rather than hunted. Some cave paintings show woolly mammoths in structures interpreted as pitfall traps. Few specimens show direct, unambiguous evidence of having been hunted by humans. A Siberian specimen with a spearhead embedded in its shoulder blade shows that a spear had been thrown at it with great force.

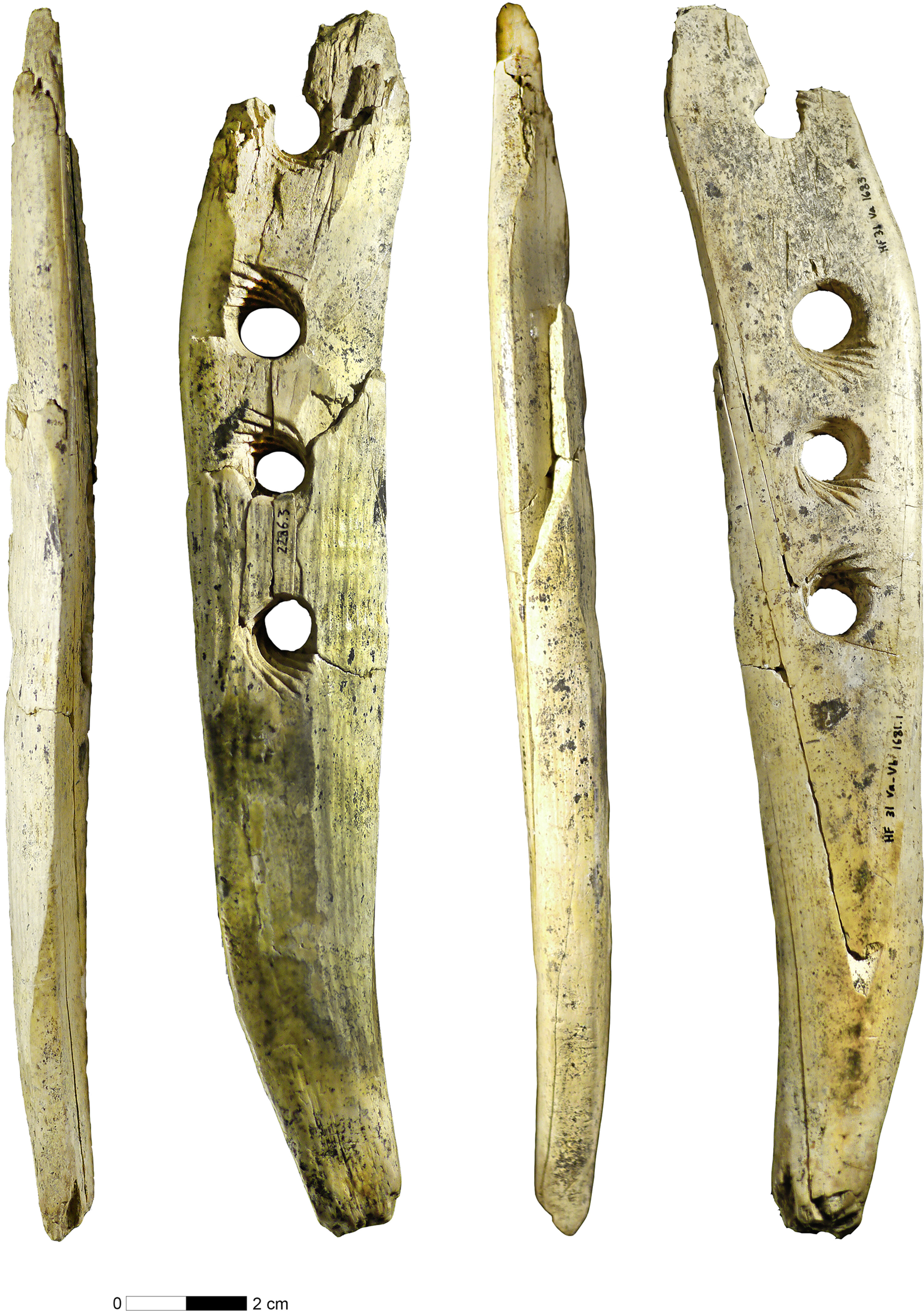
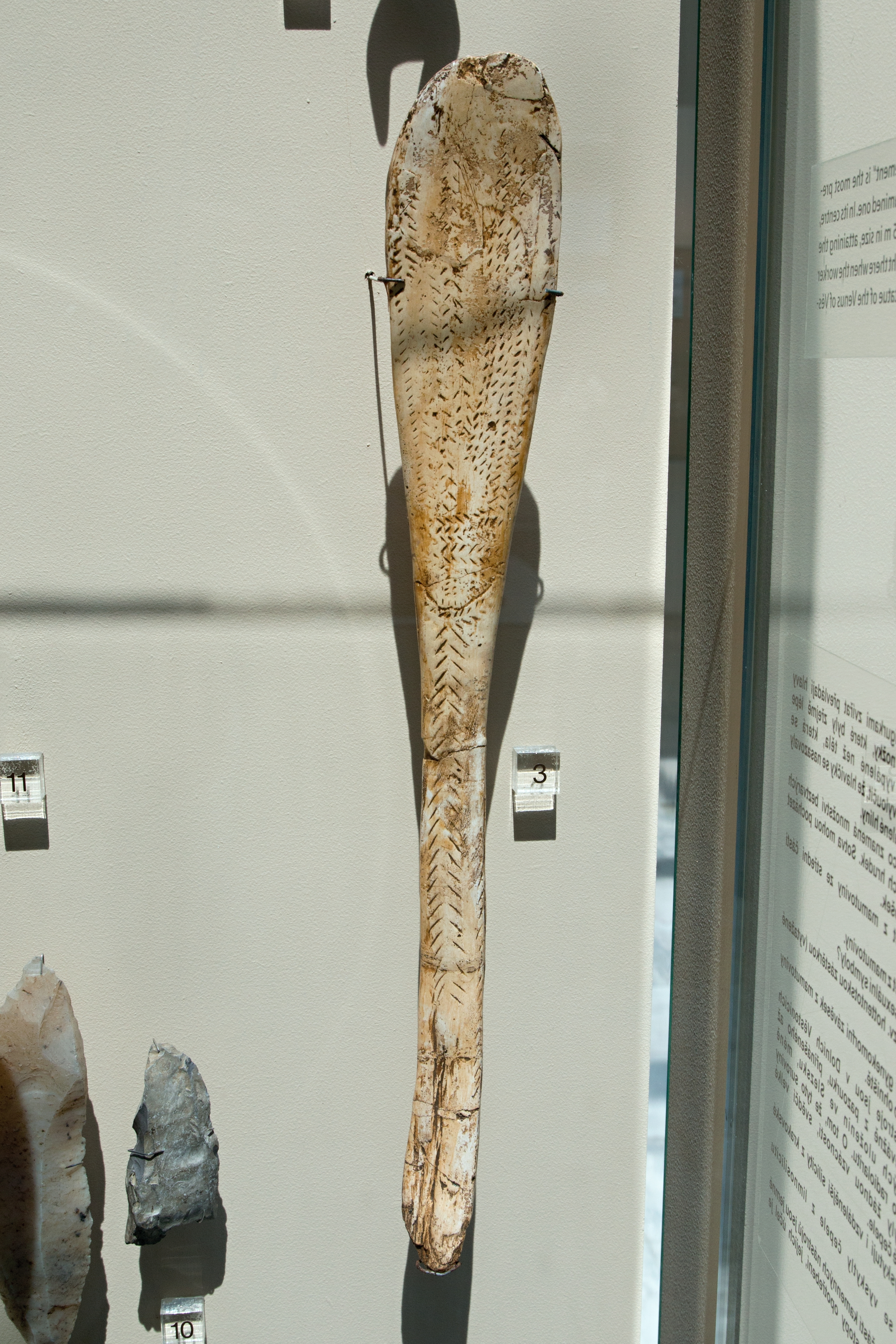
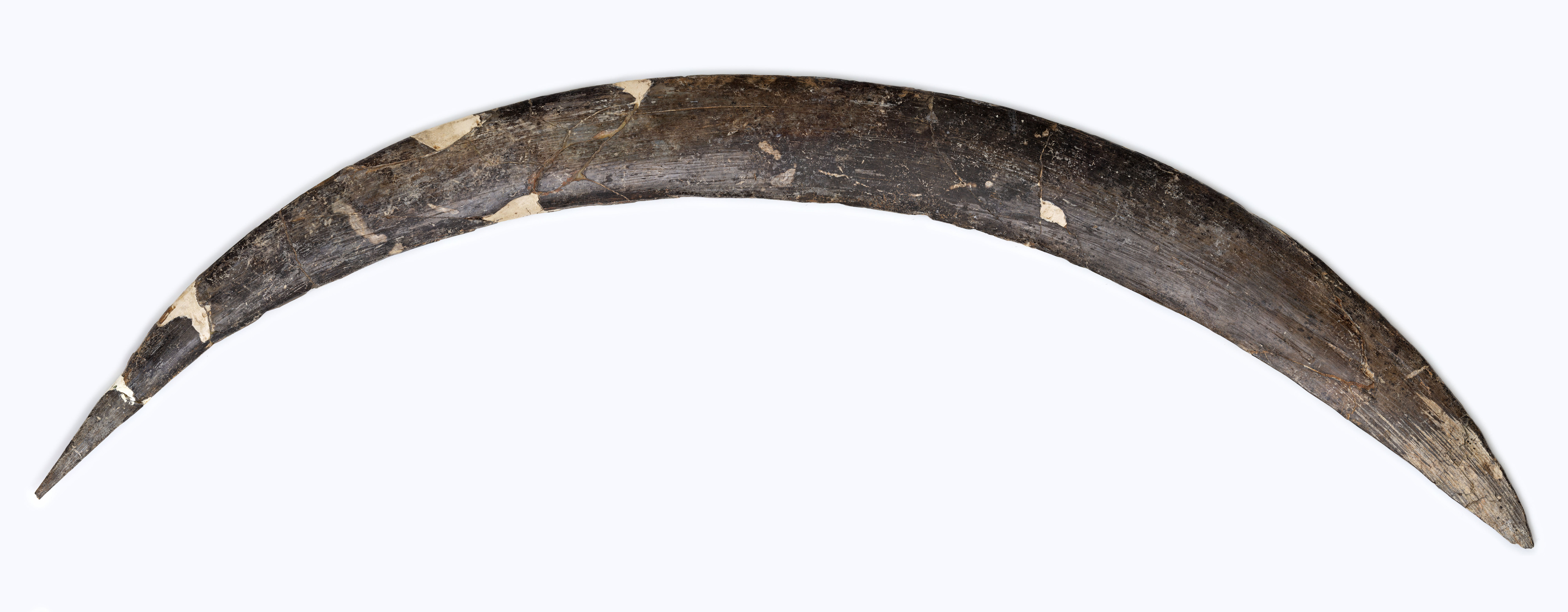
Tools made from woolly mammoth ivory; a perforated baton for ropemaking, a spoon, and a boomerang

At a site in southern Poland that contains bones from over 100 mammoths, stone spear tips have been found embedded in bones, and many stone spear points in the site were damaged from impact against mammoth bones, indicating that mammoths were the major prey for people at the time. A specimen from the Mousterian age of Italy shows evidence of spear hunting by Neanderthals. The juvenile specimen nicknamed "Yuka" is the first frozen mammoth with evidence of human interaction. It shows evidence of having been killed by a large predator and scavenged by humans shortly after. Some of its bones had been removed and were found nearby. A site near the Yana River in Siberia has revealed several specimens with evidence of human hunting, but the finds were interpreted to show that the animals were not hunted intensively, but perhaps mainly when ivory was needed. Two woolly mammoths from Wisconsin, the "Schaefer" and "Hebior mammoths", show evidence of having been butchered by Paleo-Indians.

== Extinction ==
Most woolly mammoth populations disappeared during the late Pleistocene and mid-Holocene, coinciding with the extinction of most North American Pleistocene megafauna (including the Columbian mammoth) as well as the extinctions or extirpations of steppe-associated fauna of Eurasia that coexisted with the mammoth species (such as the woolly rhinoceros, the cave lion, reindeer, saiga, the Arctic fox, and the steppe lemming). This extinction formed part of the Late Pleistocene extinctions, which began 40,000 years ago and peaked between 14,000 and 11,500 years ago. Scientists are divided over whether hunting or climate change, which led to the shrinkage of its habitat, was the main factor that contributed to the extinction of the woolly mammoth, or whether it was due to a combination of the two. Evidence from tusk-derived δ^{18}O values suggests that climate change was not the direct cause of Eurasian woolly mammoths, as δ^{18}O did not significantly vary in areas where woolly mammoths died out and where they persisted for longer into the Holocene.

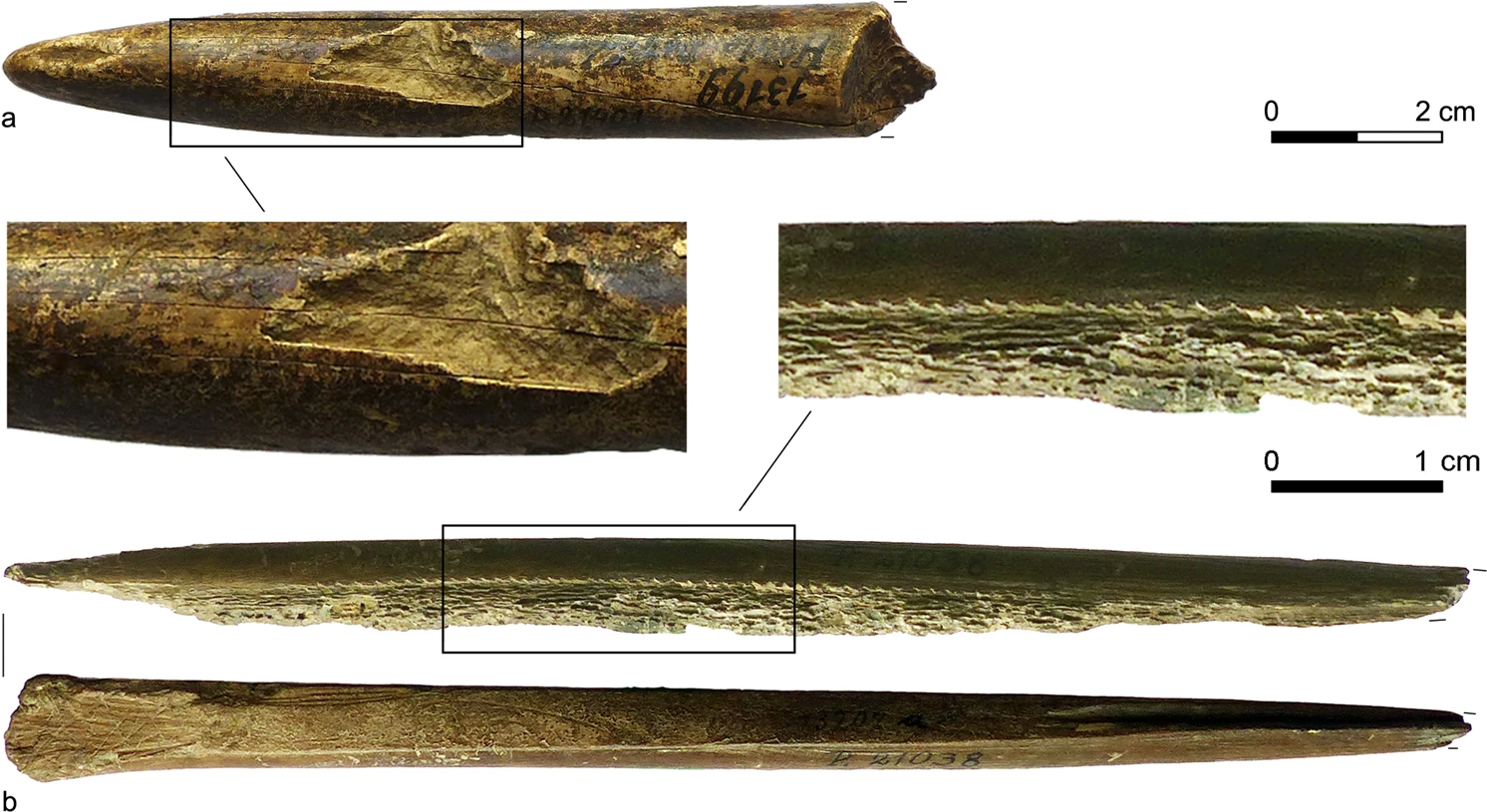
Palaeolithic projectile points made from mammoth ivory, Pekárna cave

Whatever the cause, large mammals are generally more vulnerable than smaller ones due to their smaller population size and low reproduction rates. Climatic patterns during the Last Interglacial (130–116 kyr BP) suggest that woolly mammoths and associated steppe faunas were sensitive to contractions of steppe-tundra habitats since they were adapted to cold, dry, and open environments. Genetic results and climatic models both indicate that habitats suitable for the woolly mammoth in Eurasia contracted during the interglacial period, which would have caused population bottleneck effects that restricted its range to a few northern areas. As the climate favoured colder environments, however, woolly mammoth populations rebounded during later glacial periods.

The Last Glacial Period of the late Pleistocene is considered that of the maximum geographic distribution of the woolly mammoth, occupying most of Europe, northern Asia, and northern North America, although several barriers such as ice sheets, high mountain chains, deserts, year-round water surfaces, and other grasslands prevented them from spreading farther. Towards the end of the Last Glacial period, from around 15,000 years ago, the mammoth steppe that the woolly mammoth inhabited was gradually replaced across most of Siberia with wet tundra and boreal and temperate forest, which the woolly mammoth would have found to be unfavourable habitat.

Different woolly mammoth populations did not die out simultaneously across their range, but gradually became extinct over time. The dynamics of different woolly mammoth populations varied as they experienced very different magnitudes of climatic and human impacts over time, suggesting that extinction causes would have varied by population. Most populations disappeared between 14,000 and 10,000 years ago. In Britain, woolly mammoths were still present between 14,500 and 14,000 BP. Some of Europe's last mammoths inhabited what is now Estonia; the best evidence for this population comes from the Puurmani area, where mammoth molars have been radiocarbon dated to 12,600 to 10,000 BP. The youngest fossils of the mainland population are from the Kyttyk Peninsula of Siberia and date to 9,650 years ago.

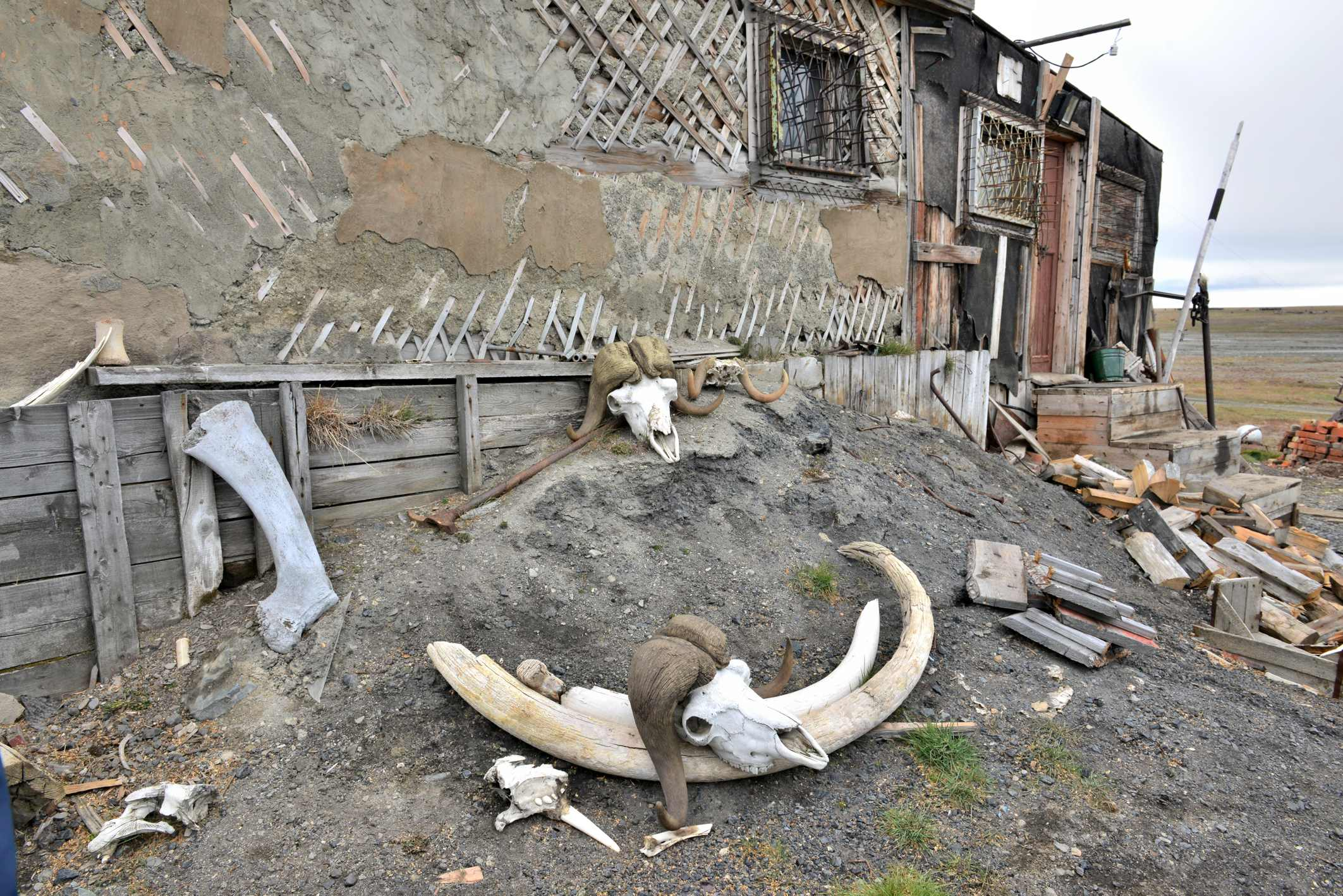
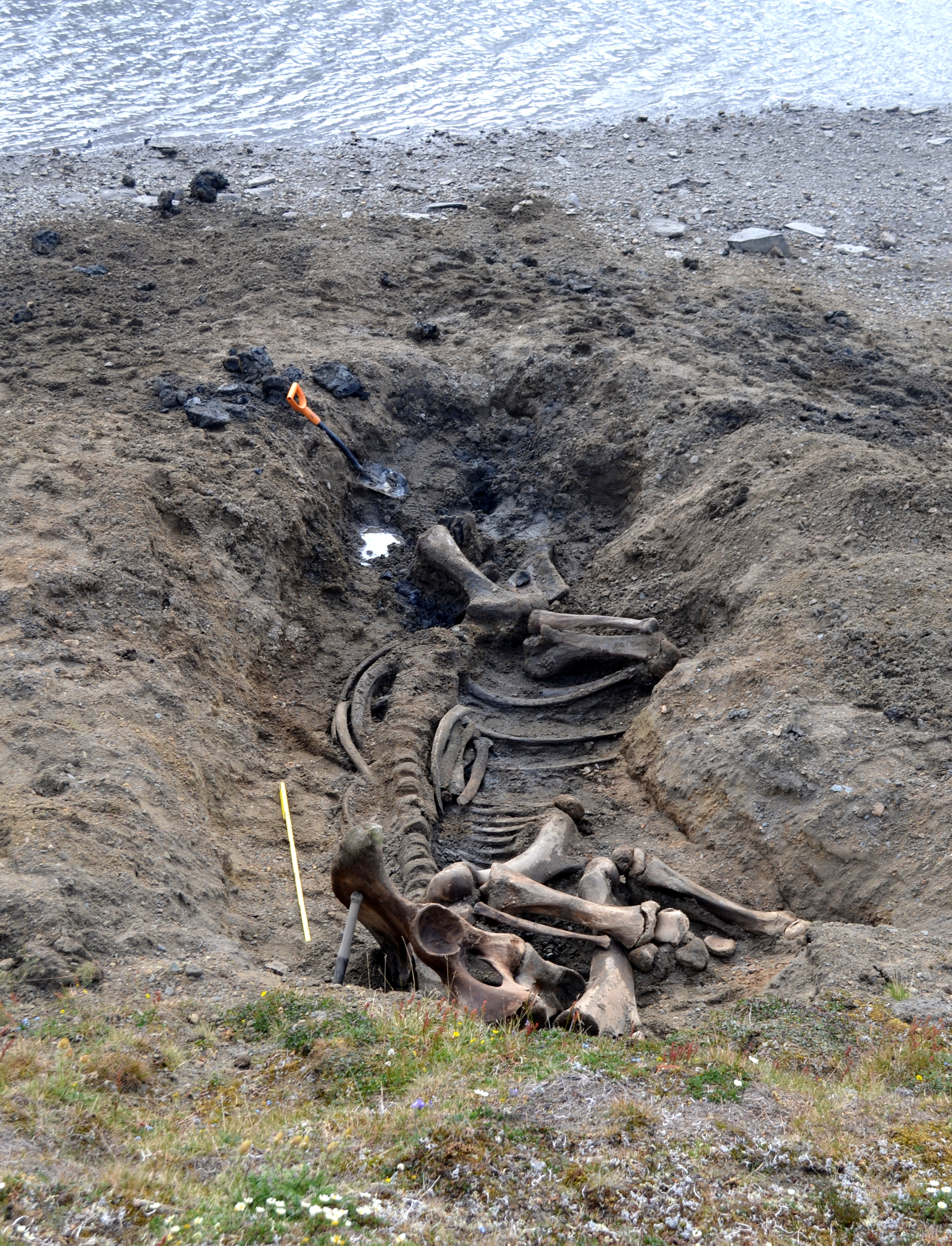
Woolly mammoth and muskox remains displayed on Wrangel Island (left) and a skeleton being excavated on the Taymyr Peninsula (right), places where mammoths survived until about 4,000 years ago

A small population of woolly mammoths survived on St. Paul Island, Alaska, well into the Holocene, with their extinction on the island being tightly constrained to around 5,600 years ago based on direct dating of bones and environmental proxies. This population is suggested to have gone extinct as a result of sea-level rise and increasing dryness of the island reducing freshwater availability, along with mammoth activity degrading the few freshwater sources on the island. The last known fossil population remained on Wrangel Island in the Arctic Ocean until 4,000 years ago, around 2000 BCE, centuries after the dawn of human civilization and the construction of the Great Pyramid and Sphinx of ancient Egypt. However some studies have asserted that environmental DNA supports the existence of small mainland populations that died out at around the same time as their island counterparts; two studies in 2021 found that based on environmental DNA, mammoths survived in the Yukon until about 5,700 years ago, roughly concurrent with the St. Paul population and on the Taymyr Peninsula of Siberia until 3,900 to 4,100 years ago, roughly concurrent with the Wrangel population. The Taymyr Peninsula, with its drier habitat, may have served as a refugium for the mammoth steppe, supporting mammoths and other widespread Ice Age mammals such as wild horses (Equus sp.). However, ancient environmental DNA in cold environments can be reworked from older sediments into younger sediments that clearly post-date extinction, raising doubt about validity of these dates.

DNA sequencing of remains of two mammoths, one from Siberia 44,800 years BP and one from Wrangel Island 4,300 years BP, indicates two major population crashes: one around 280,000 years ago, from which the population recovered, and a second about 12,000 years ago, near the ice age's end, from which it did not. The Wrangel Island mammoths were isolated for 5,000 years by rising post-ice-age sea level, and resultant inbreeding in their small population of about 300 to 1,000 individuals led to a 20% to 30% loss of heterozygosity and a 65% loss in mitochondrial DNA diversity. The population seems to have subsequently been stable, without suffering further significant loss of genetic diversity. Genetic evidence thus implies the extinction of this final population was sudden, rather than the culmination of a gradual decline.

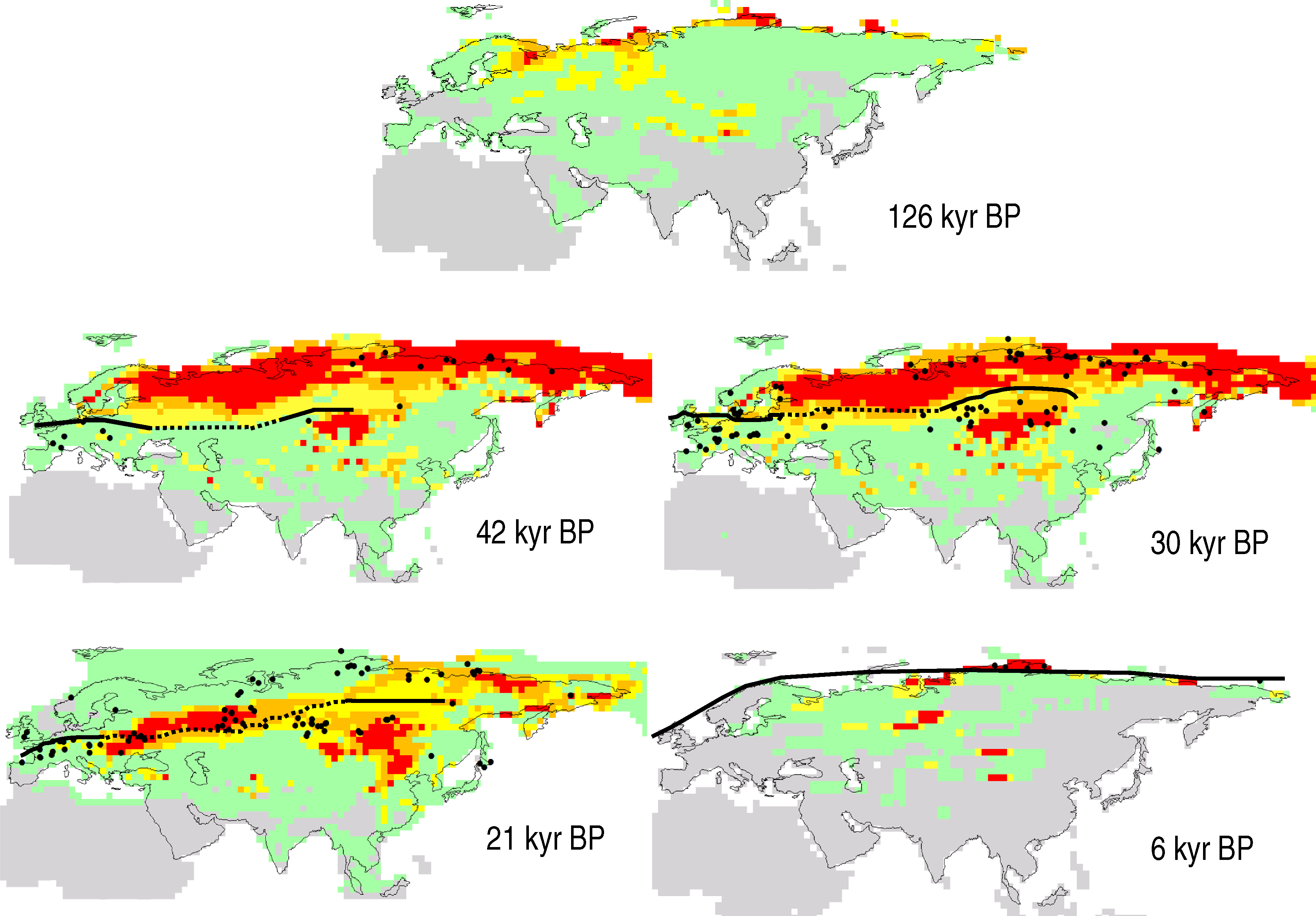
Map showing climatic suitability for woolly mammoths in the Late Pleistocene and Holocene of Eurasia: red is increasing suitability, green is decreasing suitability. Black points are records of mammoths, black lines are the northern limit of humans

Before their extinction, the Wrangel Island mammoths had accumulated numerous genetic defects due to their small population; in particular, a number of genes for olfactory receptors and urinary proteins became nonfunctional, possibly because they had lost their selective value on the island environment. It is not clear whether these genetic changes contributed to their extinction. It has been proposed that these changes are consistent with the concept of genomic meltdown, however, this has been contested by later analysis of the genomes of some of the last mammoths on Wrangel Island, which suggests that highly deleterious mutations had been significantly purged to levels lower than that in mainland populations, though the level of moderately deleterious mutations was elevated. The sudden disappearance of an apparently stable population may be more consistent with a catastrophic event, possibly related to climate (such as icing of the snowpack), disease, or a human hunting expedition.

The disappearance is relatively close in time with the first evidence of humans on the island, though other authors have suggested that woolly mammoths were almost certainly extinct for several centuries prior to the presence of humans on Wrangel Island (which dates to around 3,600 years ago). The woolly mammoths of eastern Beringia (modern Alaska and Yukon) had similarly died out about 13,300 years ago, soon (roughly 1,000 years) after the first appearance of humans in the area, which parallels the fate of all the other late Pleistocene proboscideans (mammoths, gomphotheres, and mastodons), as well as most of the rest of the megafauna, of the Americas. In contrast, the St. Paul Island mammoth population apparently died out significantly before human arrival.

Changes in climate shrank suitable mammoth habitat from 7,700,000 km^{2} (3,000,000 sq mi) 42,000 years ago to 800,000 km^{2} (310,000 sq mi), a roughly 90% decrease, by 6,000 years ago. Woolly mammoths survived an even greater loss of habitat at the end of the Penultimate Glacial Period and the onset of the Last Interglacial, approximately 125,000 years ago. Studies of an 11,300–11,000-year-old trackway in south-western Canada showed that M. primigenius was in decline while coexisting with humans, since far fewer tracks of juveniles were identified than would be expected in a normal herd. It has been suggested that human hunting exerted significant pressure on woolly mammoth populations for thousands of years across their range, making the population abundance of woolly mammoths considerably lower than it would have been otherwise even prior to their range decline, and likely hastened the range collapse of woolly mammoths in response to climate change.

=== Revival efforts ===
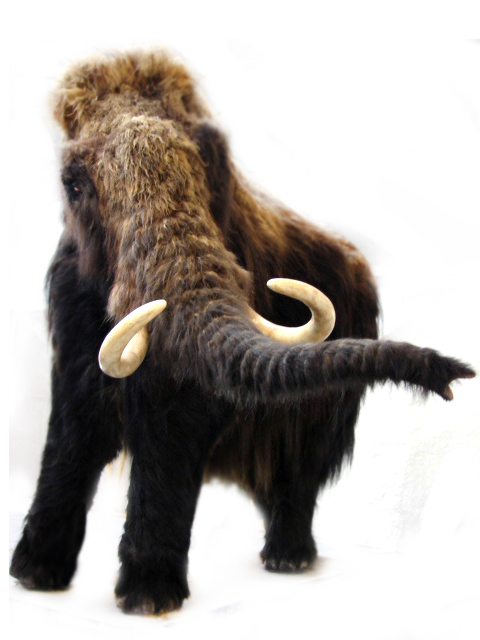
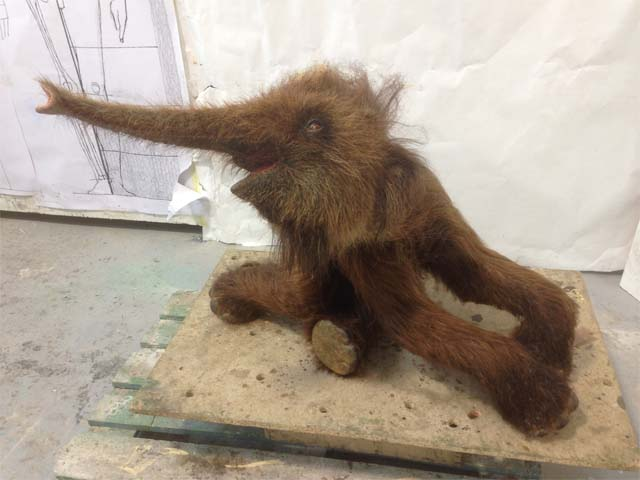
Models of an adult and the calf "Dima" in State Museum of Natural History Stuttgart

The existence of preserved soft tissue remains and DNA of woolly mammoths has led to the idea that the species could be resurrected by scientific means. Several methods have been proposed to achieve this. Cloning would involve removal of the DNA-containing nucleus of the egg cell of a female elephant and replacement with a nucleus from woolly mammoth tissue. The cell would then be stimulated into dividing and inserted back into a female elephant. The resulting calf would have the genes of the woolly mammoth, although its fetal environment would be different. Most intact mammoths have had little usable DNA because of their conditions of preservation. There is not enough to guide the production of an embryo.

A second method involves artificially inseminating an elephant egg cell with sperm cells from a frozen woolly mammoth carcass. The resulting offspring would be an elephant–mammoth hybrid, and the process would have to be repeated so more hybrids could be used in breeding. After several generations of cross-breeding these hybrids, an almost pure woolly mammoth would be produced. The fact that sperm cells of modern mammals are viable for 15 years at most after deepfreezing makes this method unfeasible.

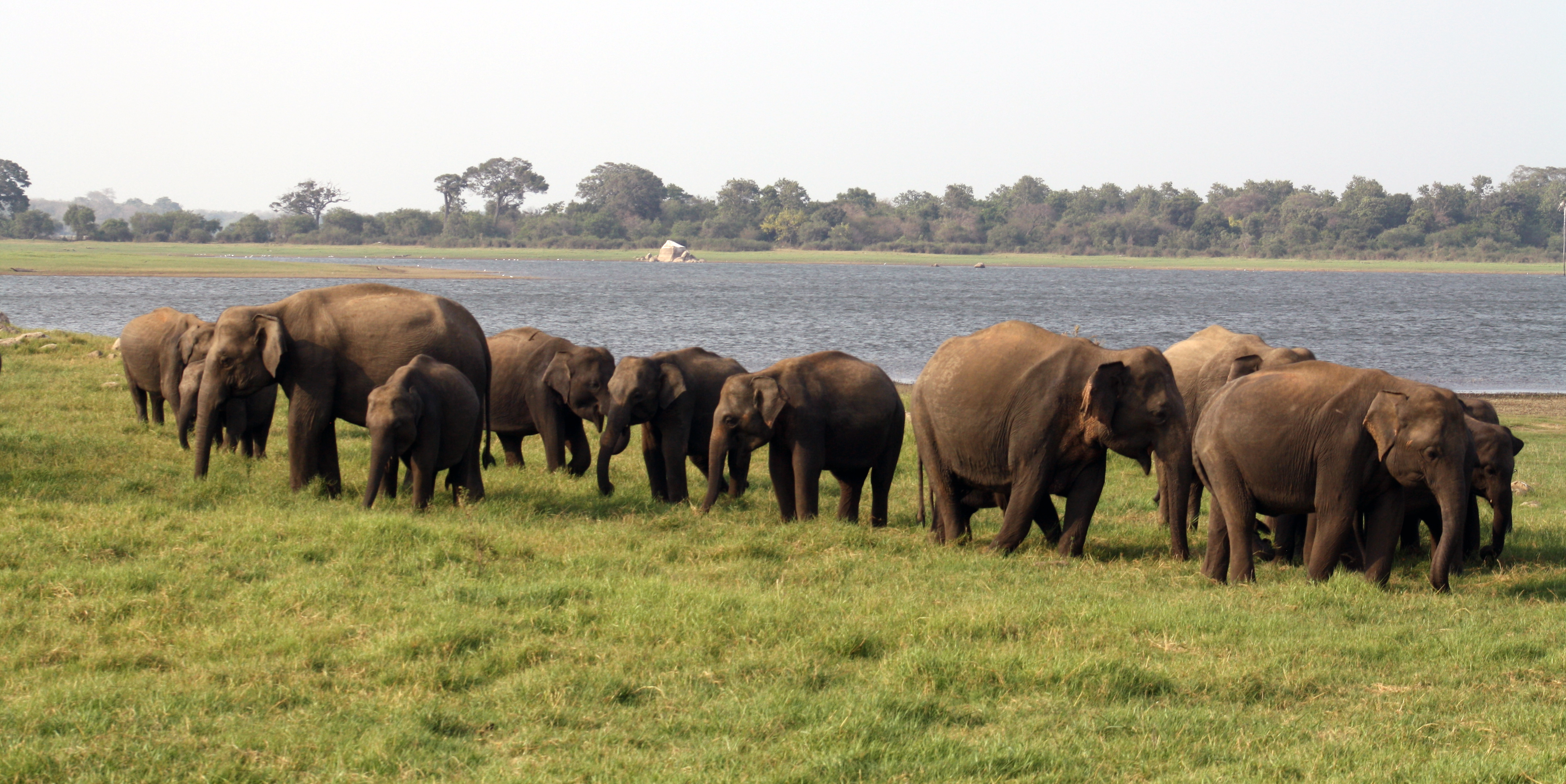
Elephants are highly gregarious, as shown by these Sri Lankan elephants

Several projects are working on gradually replacing the genes in elephant cells with mammoth genes. By 2015 and using the new CRISPR DNA editing technique, one team, led by George Church, had some woolly mammoth genes edited into the genome of an Asian elephant; focusing on cold-resistance initially, the target genes are for the external ear size, subcutaneous fat, haemoglobin, and hair attributes. If any method is ever successful, a suggestion has been made to introduce the hybrids to a wildlife reserve in Siberia called the Pleistocene Park.

Some researchers question the ethics of such recreation attempts. In addition to the technical problems, not much habitat is left that would be suitable for elephant-mammoth hybrids. Because the species was social and gregarious, creating a few specimens would not be ideal. The time and resources required would be enormous, and the scientific benefits would be unclear, suggesting these resources should instead be used to preserve extant elephant species which are endangered. The ethics of using elephants as surrogate mothers in hybridisation attempts has been questioned, as most embryos would not survive, and knowing the exact needs of a hybrid elephant–mammoth calf would be impossible. Another concern is the introduction of unknown pathogens if de-extinction efforts were to succeed. In 2021, an Austin-based company raised funds to reintroduce the species in the Arctic tundra.

== Fossil specimens ==
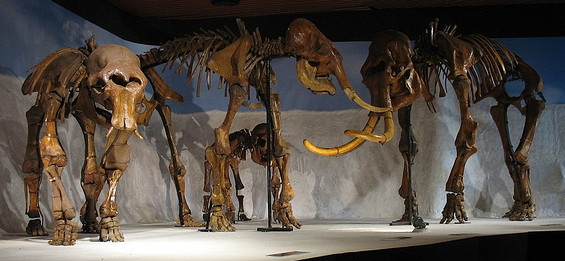
Mounted "family group" from Tomsk

Woolly mammoth fossils have been found in many different types of deposits, including former rivers and lakes, and in "Doggerland" in the North Sea, which was dry at times during the ice age. Such fossils are usually fragmentary and contain no soft tissue. Accumulations of modern elephant remains have been termed "elephants' graveyards", as these sites were erroneously thought to be where old elephants went to die. Similar accumulations of woolly mammoth bones have been found; these are thought to be the result of individuals dying near or in the rivers over thousands of years, and their bones eventually being brought together by the streams. Some accumulations are thought to be the remains of herds that died together at the same time, perhaps due to flooding. Natural traps, such as kettle holes, sink holes, and mud, have trapped mammoths in separate events over time.

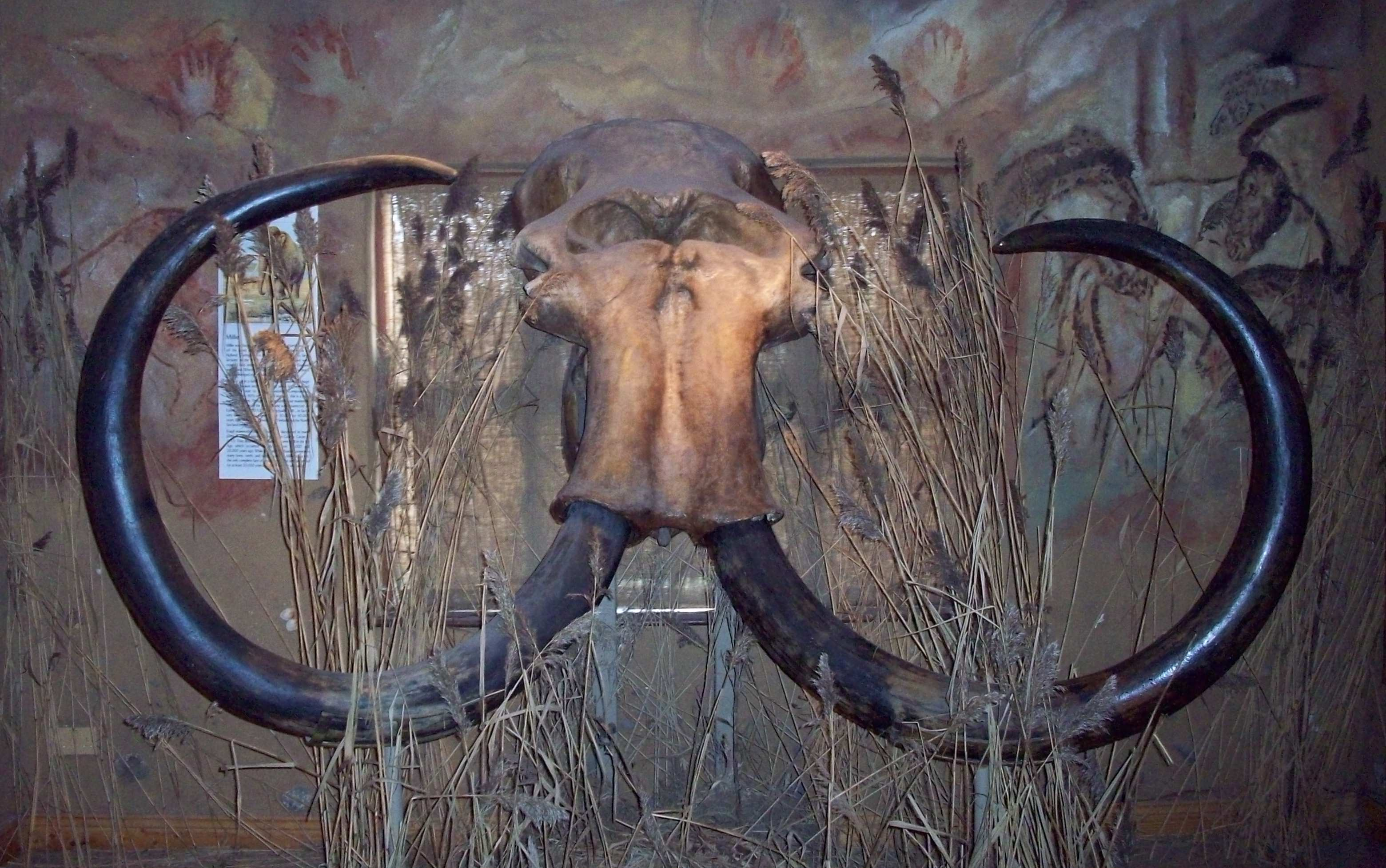
Skull discovered by fishermen in the North Sea ("Doggerland"), at Celtic and Prehistoric Museum, Ireland

Apart from frozen remains, the only soft tissue known is from a specimen that was preserved in a petroleum seep in Starunia, Poland. Frozen remains of woolly mammoths have been found in the northern parts of Siberia and Alaska, with far fewer finds in the latter. Such remains are mostly found above the Arctic Circle, in permafrost. Soft tissue apparently was less likely to be preserved between 30,000 and 15,000 years ago, perhaps because the climate was milder during that period. Most specimens have partially degraded before discovery, due to exposure or to being scavenged. This "natural mummification" required the animal to have been buried rapidly in liquid or semisolids such as silt, mud, and icy water, which then froze.

The presence of undigested food in the stomach and seed pods still in the mouth of many of the specimens suggests neither starvation nor exposure is likely. The maturity of this ingested vegetation places the time of death in autumn rather than in spring, when flowers would be expected. The animals may have fallen through ice into small ponds or potholes, entombing them. Many are certainly known to have been killed in rivers, perhaps through being swept away by floods. In one location, by the Byoryolyokh River in Yakutia in Siberia, more than 8,000 bones from at least 140 mammoths have been found in a single spot, apparently having been swept there by the current.

=== Frozen specimens ===
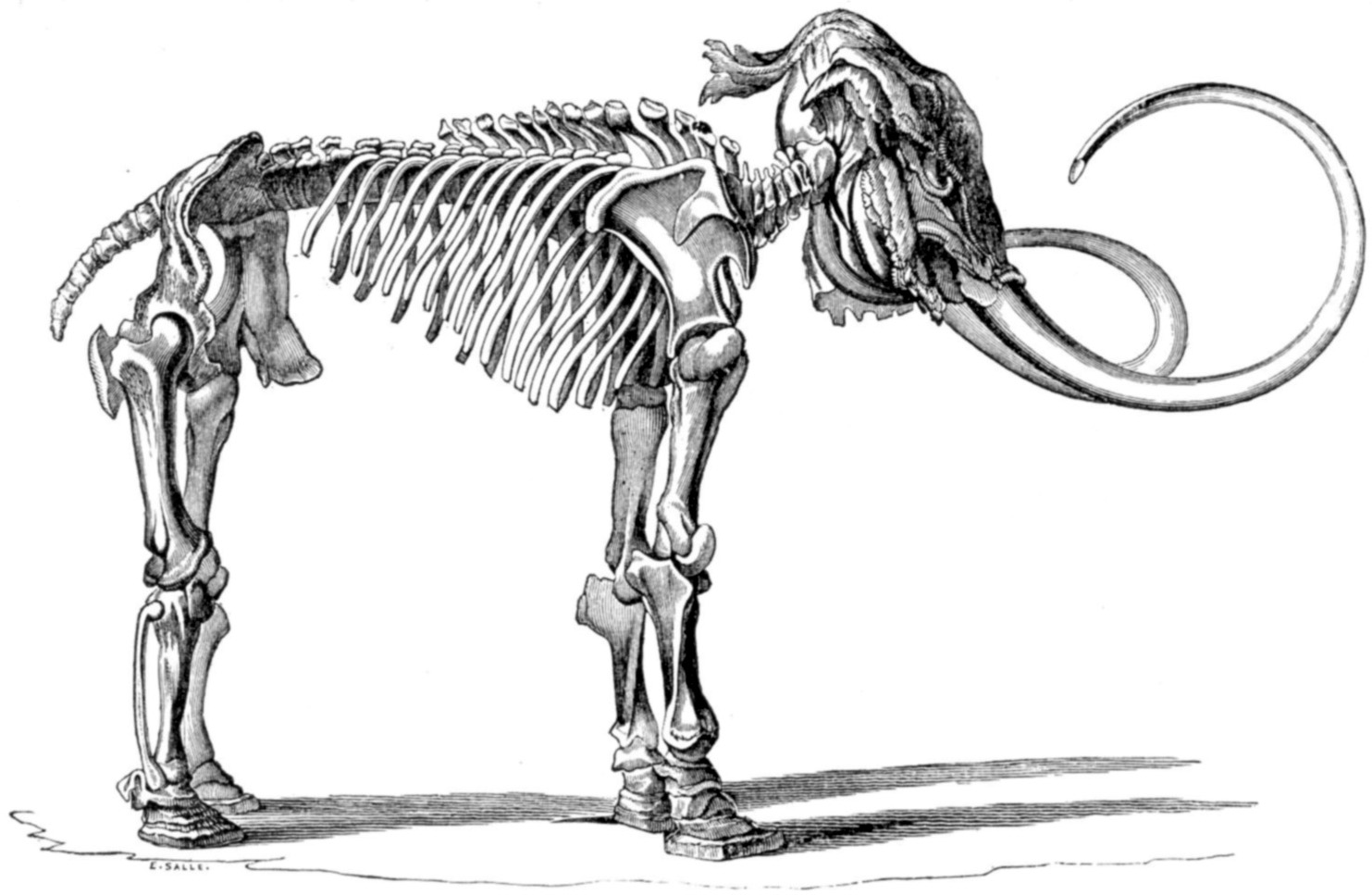
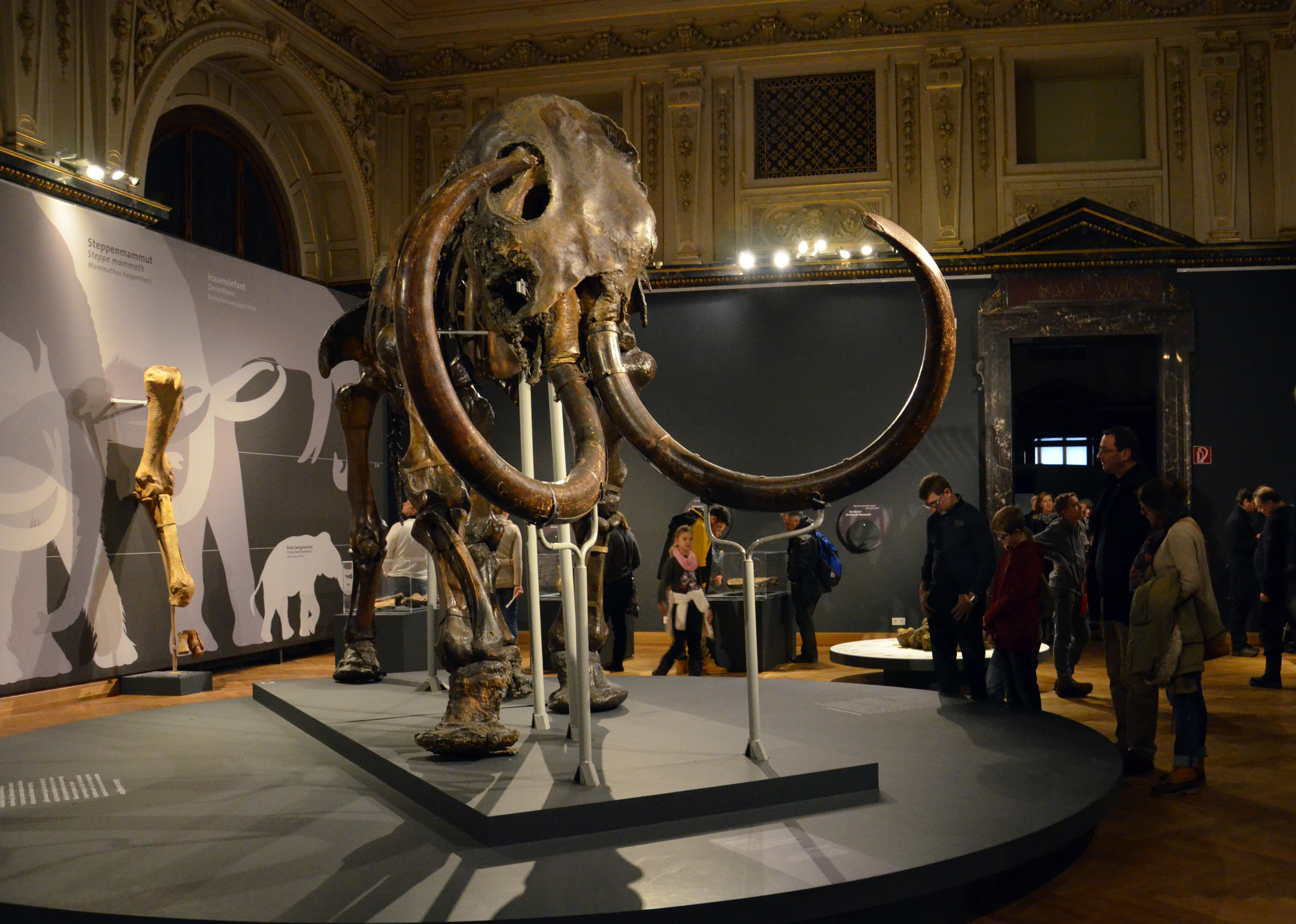
The "Adams mammoth" as illustrated in the 1800s (left) and on exhibit in Vienna; skin can be seen on its head and feet.

Between 1692 and 1806, a handful of reports of frozen mammoth remains with soft tissue were published reached Europe, though none were collected during that time. While frozen woolly mammoth carcasses had been excavated by Europeans as early as 1728, the first fully documented specimen was discovered near the delta of the Lena River in 1799 by Ossip Schumachov, a Siberian hunter. While in Yakutsk in 1806, Michael Friedrich Adams heard about the frozen mammoth. Adams recovered the entire skeleton, apart from the tusks, which Shumachov had already sold, and one foreleg, most of the skin, and nearly 18 kg (40 lb) of hair. During his return voyage, he purchased a pair of tusks that he believed were the ones that Shumachov had sold. Adams brought all to the Zoological Museum of the Zoological Institute of the Russian Academy of Sciences, and the task of mounting the skeleton was given to Wilhelm Gottlieb Tilesius. This was one of the first attempts at reconstructing the skeleton of an extinct animal. Most of the reconstruction is correct, but Tilesius placed each tusk in the opposite socket, so that they curved outward instead of inward. The error was not corrected until 1899, and the correct placement of mammoth tusks was still a matter of debate into the 20th century.

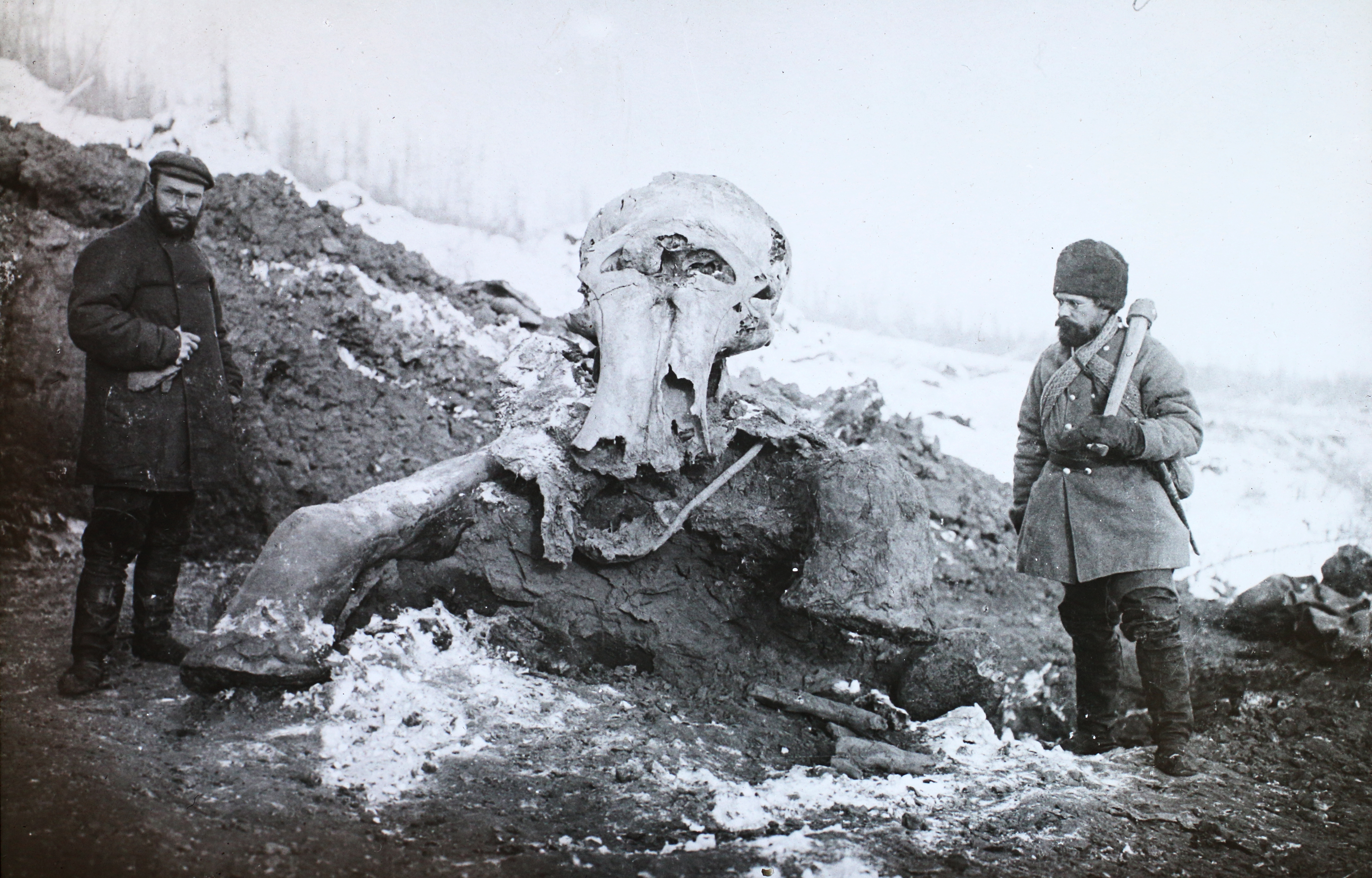
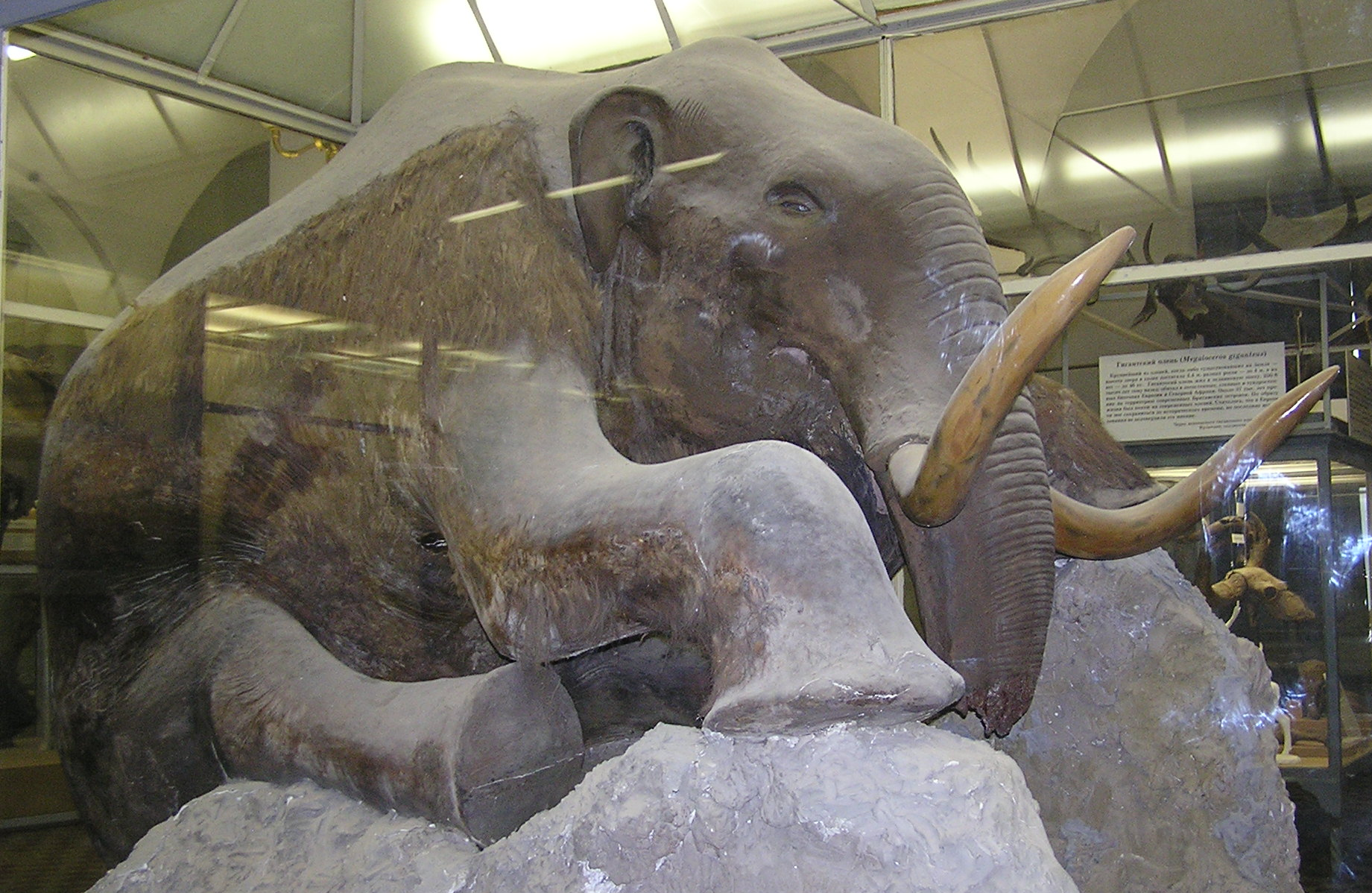
The "Berezovka mammoth" during excavation in 1901 (left), and a model partially covered by its skin, Museum of Zoology in St. Petersburg

The 1901 excavation of the "Berezovka mammoth" is the best documented of the early finds. It was discovered at the Siberian Berezovka River (after a dog had noticed its smell), and the Russian authorities financed its excavation. The entire expedition took 10 months, and the specimen had to be cut to pieces before it could be transported to St. Petersburg. Most of the skin on the head as well as the trunk had been scavenged by predators, and most of the internal organs had rotted away. It was identified as a 35- to 40-year-old male, which had died 35,000 years ago. The animal still had grass between its teeth and on the tongue, showing that it had died suddenly. One of its shoulder blades was broken, which may have happened when it fell into a crevasse. It may have died of asphyxiation, as indicated by its erect penis. One third of a replica of the mammoth in the Museum of Zoology of St. Petersburg is covered in skin and hair of the "Berezovka mammoth".

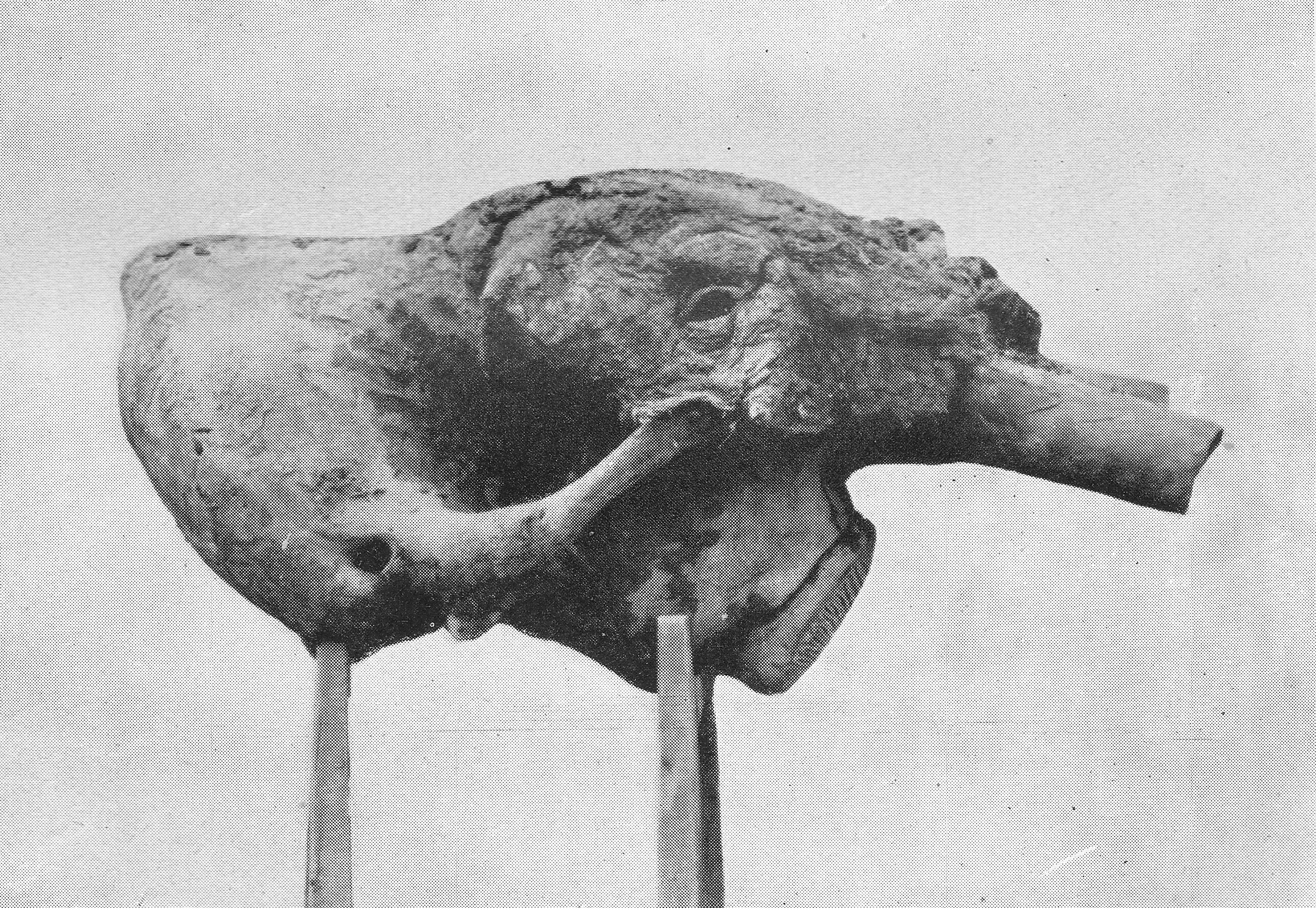
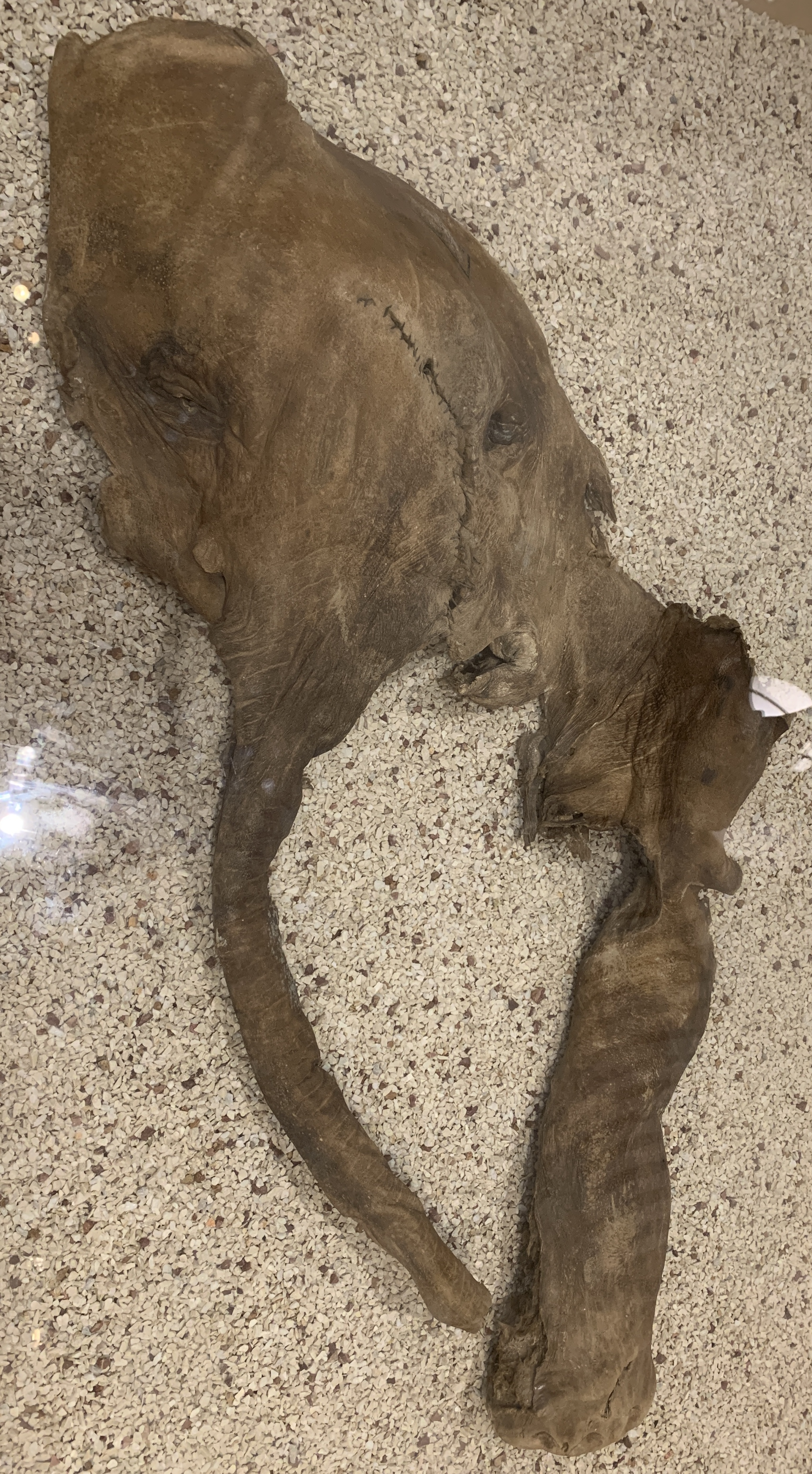
Head of the Sanga-Yuryakh mammoth with skin (left), and the calf "Effie" at the American Museum of Natural History

By 1929, the remains of 34 mammoths with frozen soft tissues (skin, flesh, or organs) had been documented. Only four of them were relatively complete. Since then, about that many more have been found. In most cases, the flesh showed signs of decay before its freezing and later desiccation. Since 1860, Russian authorities have offered rewards of up to 1000 ₽ for finds of frozen woolly mammoth carcasses. Often, such finds were kept secret due to superstition. Several carcasses have been lost because they were not reported, and one was fed to dogs. Despite the rewards, native Yakuts were also reluctant to report mammoth finds to the authorities due to bad treatment of them in the past. In more recent years, scientific expeditions have been devoted to finding carcasses instead of relying solely on chance encounters. The most famous frozen specimen from Alaska is a calf nicknamed "Effie", which was found in 1948. It consists of the head, the trunk, and a foreleg and is about 25,000 years old.

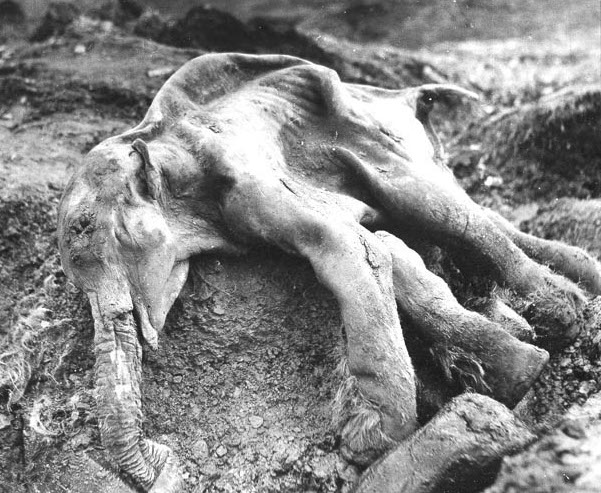
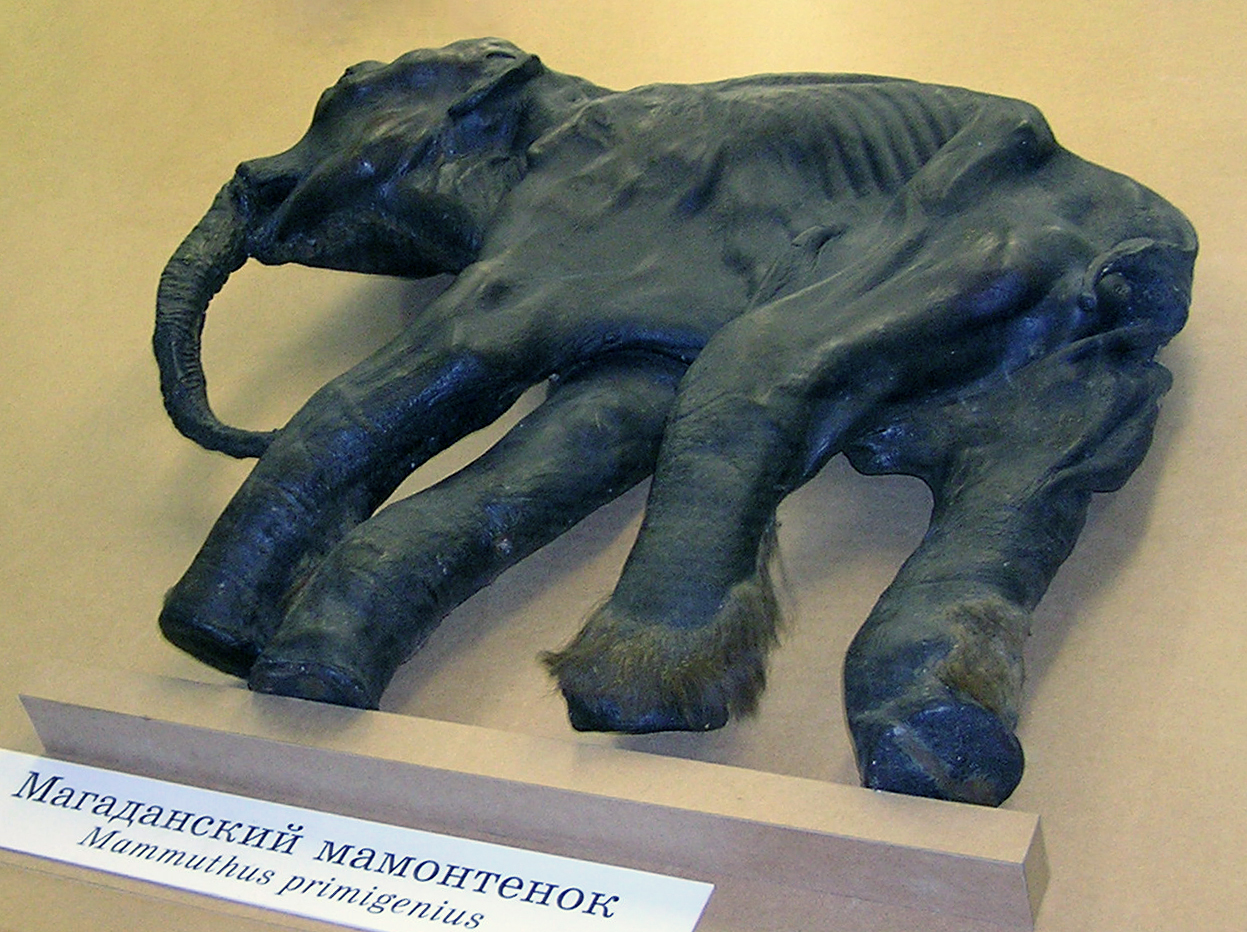
"Dima", a frozen calf, during excavation (left), and as exhibited in the Museum of Zoology; note fur on the legs

In 1977, the well-preserved carcass of a seven- to eight-month-old woolly mammoth calf named "Dima" was discovered. This carcass was recovered near a tributary of the Kolyma River in northeastern Siberia. This specimen weighed about 100 kg (220 lb) at death and was 104 cm (41 in) high and 115 cm (45 in) long. Radiocarbon dating determined that "Dima" died about 40,000 years ago. Its internal organs are similar to those of modern elephants, but its ears are only one-tenth the size of those of an African elephant of similar age. A less complete juvenile, nicknamed "Mascha", was found on the Yamal Peninsula in 1988. It was 3–4 months old, and a laceration on its right foot may have been the cause of death. It is the westernmost frozen mammoth found.

In 1997, a piece of mammoth tusk was discovered protruding from the tundra of the Taymyr Peninsula in Siberia, Russia. In 1999, this 20,380-year-old carcass and 25 tons of surrounding sediment were transported by an Mi-26 heavy lift helicopter to an ice cave in Khatanga. The specimen was nicknamed the "Jarkov mammoth". In October 2000, the careful defrosting operations in this cave began with the use of hair dryers to keep the hair and other soft tissues intact.

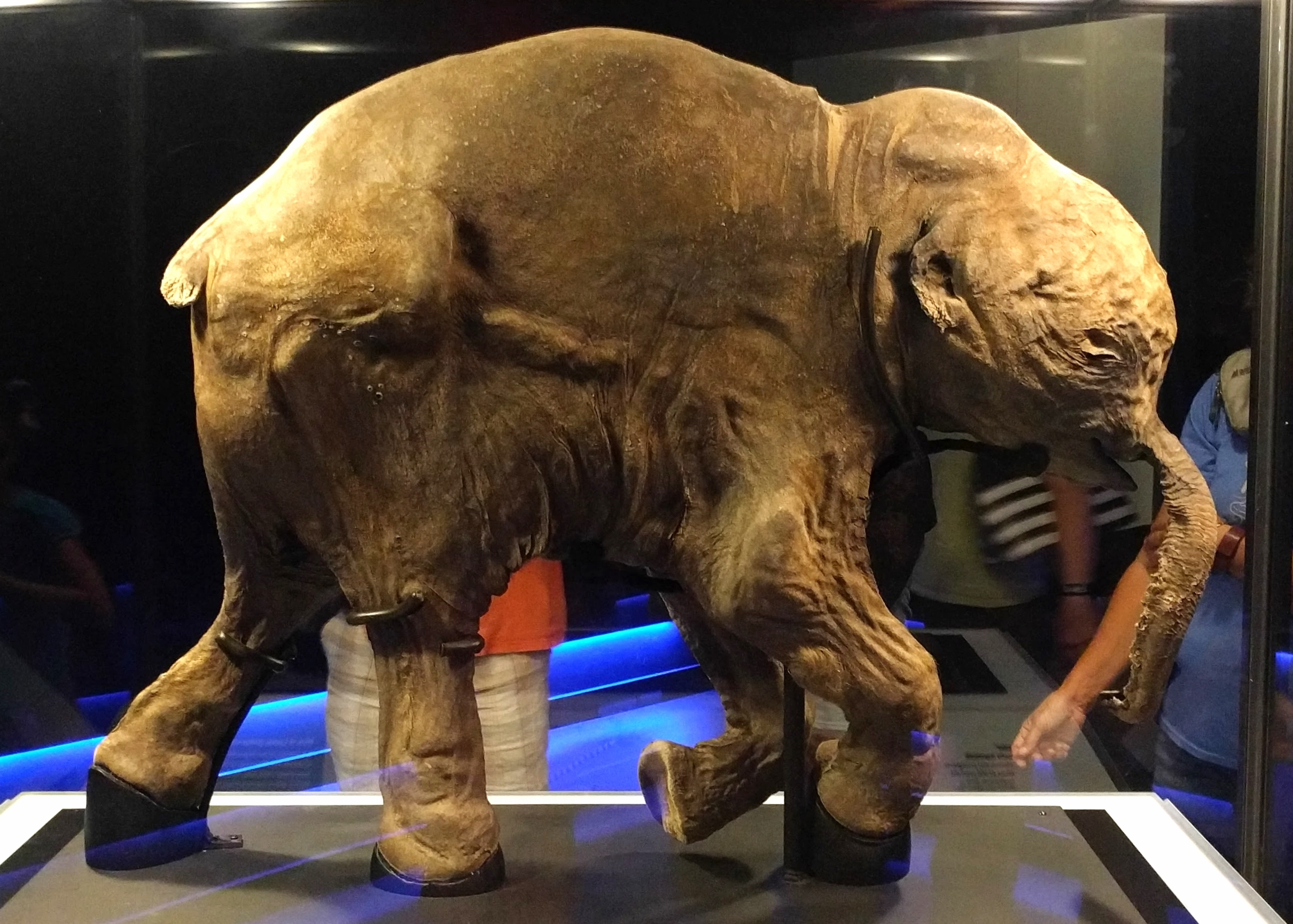
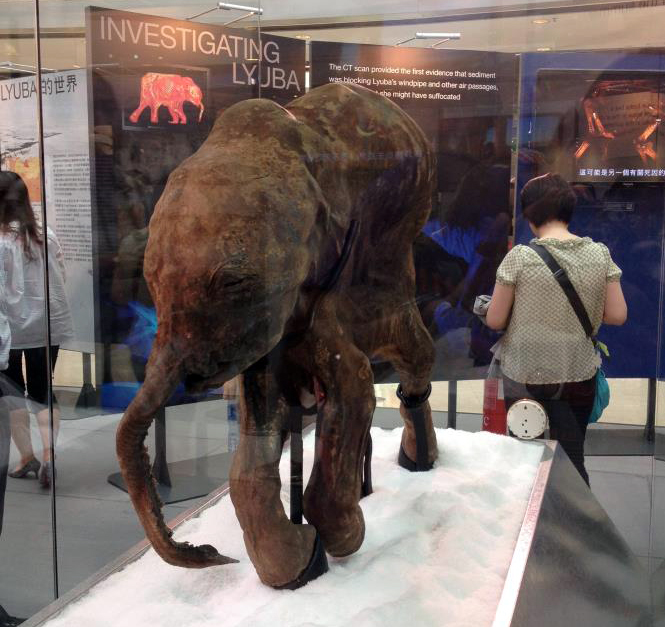
The calf "Lyuba", in Royal BC Museum and IFC Mall

In 2002, a well-preserved carcass was discovered near the Maxunuokha River in northern Yakutia, which was recovered during three excavations. This adult male specimen was called the "Yukagir mammoth" and is estimated to have lived around 18,560 years ago, been 2.829 m (9 ft 3.4 in) tall at the shoulder, and weighed between 4 and 5 tonnes. It is one of the best-preserved mammoths ever found due to the almost complete head, covered in skin, but without the trunk. Some postcranial remains were found, some with soft tissue.

In 2007, the carcass of a female calf nicknamed "Lyuba" was discovered near the Yuribey River, where it had been buried for 41,800 years. By cutting a section through a molar and analysing its growth lines, they found that the animal had died at the age of one month. The mummified calf weighed 50 kg (110 lb), was 85 cm (33 in) high and 130 cm (51 in) in length. At the time of discovery, its eyes and trunk were intact and some fur remained on its body. Its organs and skin are very well preserved. "Lyuba" is believed to have been suffocated by mud in a river that its herd was crossing. After death, its body may have been colonised by bacteria that produce lactic acid, which "pickled" it, preserving the mammoth in a nearly pristine state.

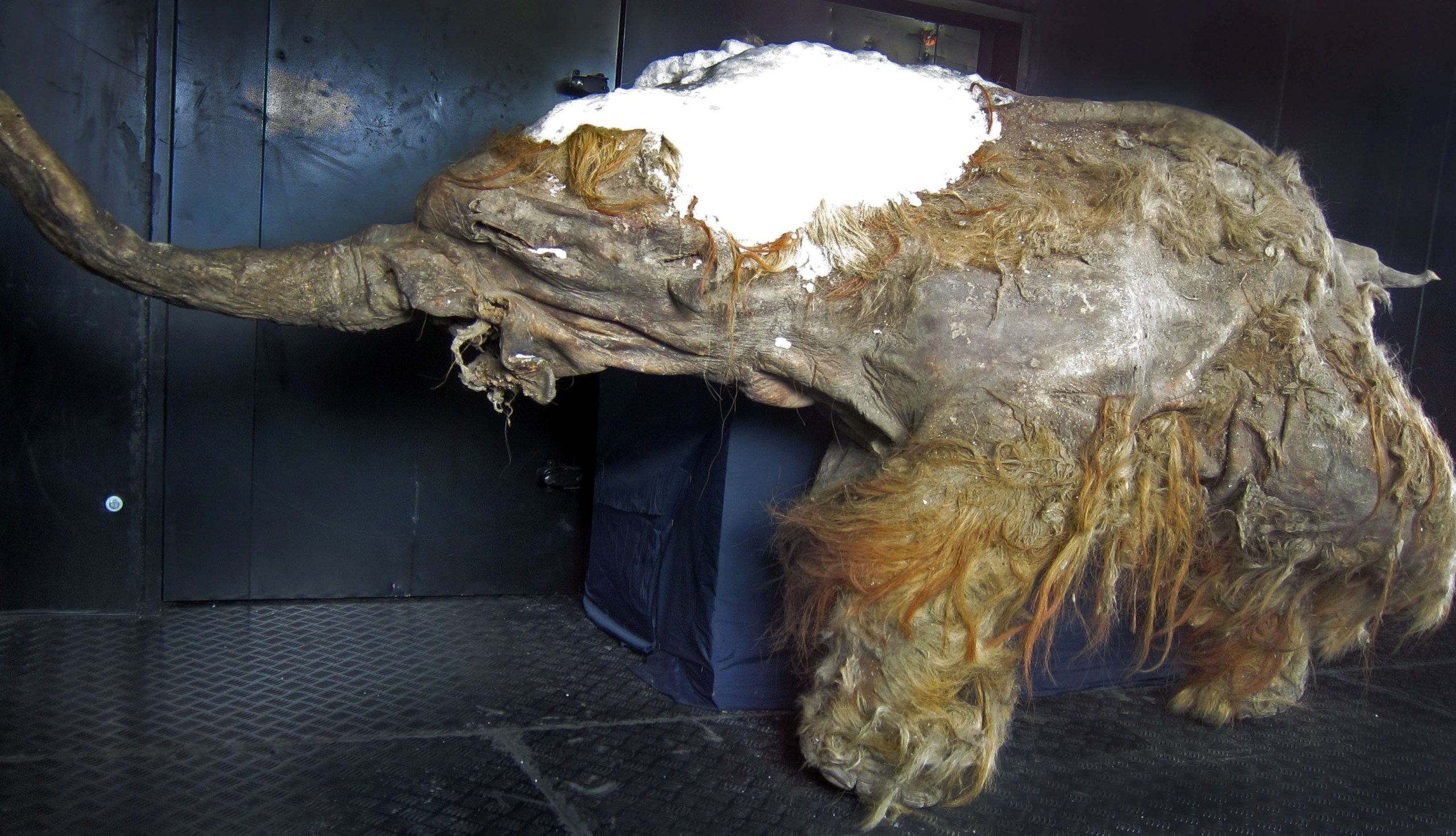
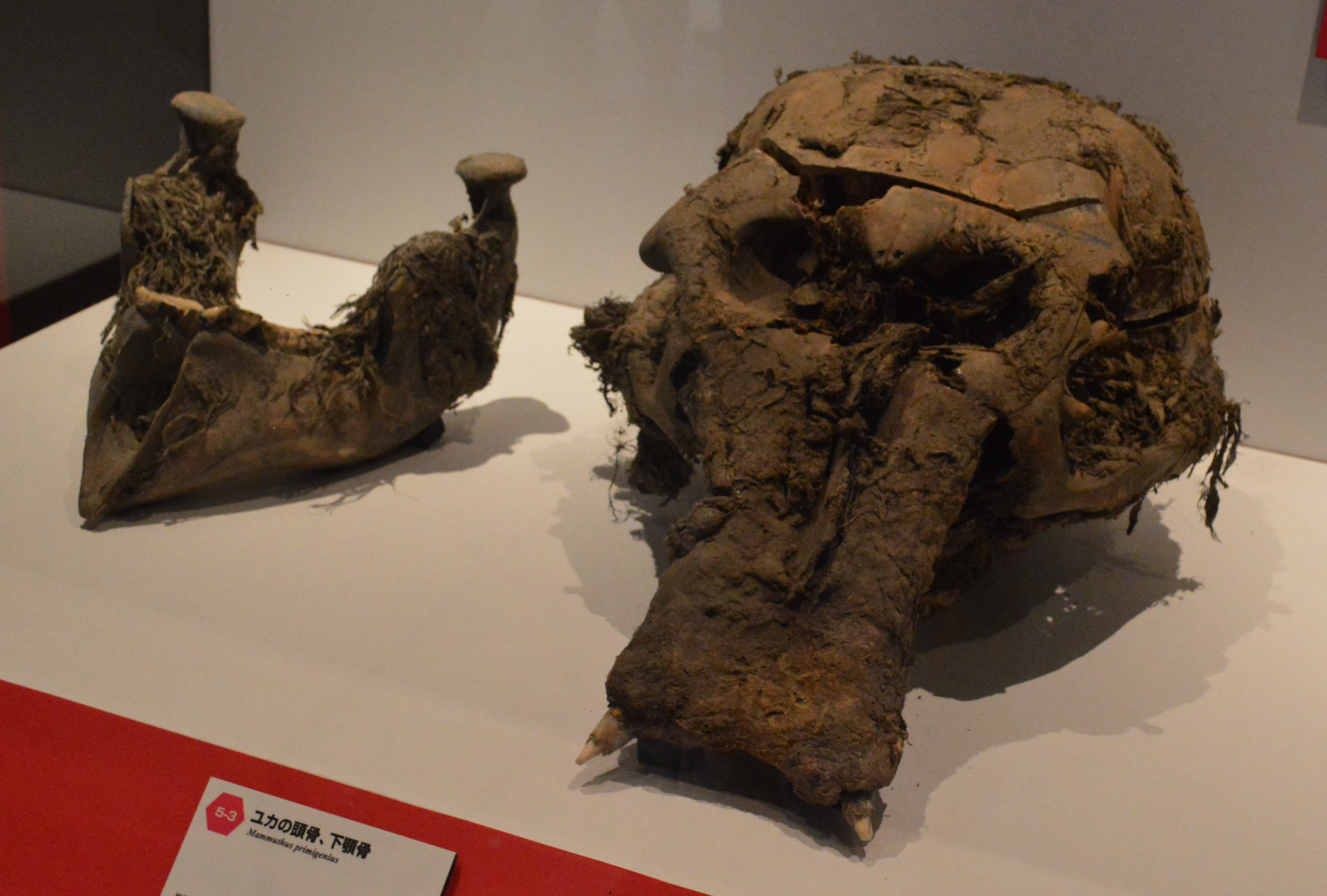
The frozen calf "Yuka" (left), and its skull and jaw which may have been extracted from the carcass by prehistoric humans

In 2010, a juvenile nicknamed it "Yuka" was found in Siberia, the first known adolescent female, estimated to have been 2.5 years. It had man-made cut marks, and its skull and pelvis had been removed prior to discovery, but were found nearby. After being discovered, the skin of "Yuka" was prepared to produce a taxidermy mount. In 2019, a group of researchers managed to obtain signs of biological activity after transferring nuclei of "Yuka" into mouse oocytes.

In 2013, a well-preserved carcass was found on Maly Lyakhovsky Island, one of the islands in the New Siberian Islands archipelago. It was estimated to be a female, 50 and 60 years old at the time of death (with 55 years old being the best-supported estimate in this range), with a shoulder height of 2.4 m (7.9 ft). The carcass contained well-preserved muscular tissue. When it was extracted from the ice, liquid blood spilled from the abdominal cavity. The finders interpreted this as indicating woolly mammoth blood possessed antifreezing properties. In 2022, a complete female baby woolly mammoth was found by a miner in the Klondike gold fields of Yukon, Canada. The specimen is estimated to have died 30,000 years ago and was nicknamed "Nun cho ga", meaning "big baby animal" in the local Hän language. It is the best preserved woolly mammoth mummy found in North America, and was the same size as Lyuba. In 2025, a 50,000-year-old frozen calf nicknamed "Yana", after the Yana River basin of Yakutia where it was found, was announced. It was found by local residents and was described as the "best preserved" mammoth carcass, since it was found before it could be eaten by animals.

== Cultural significance ==
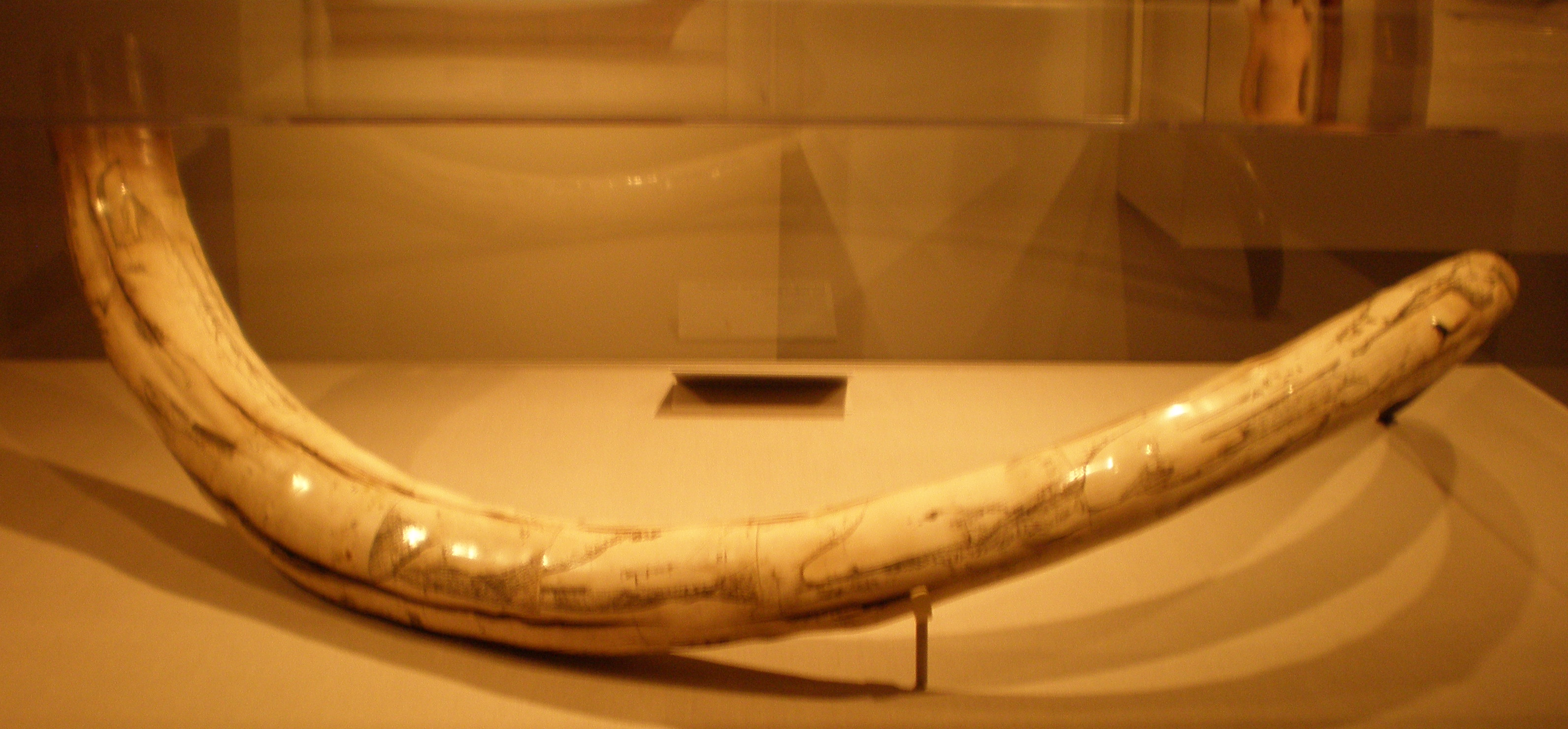
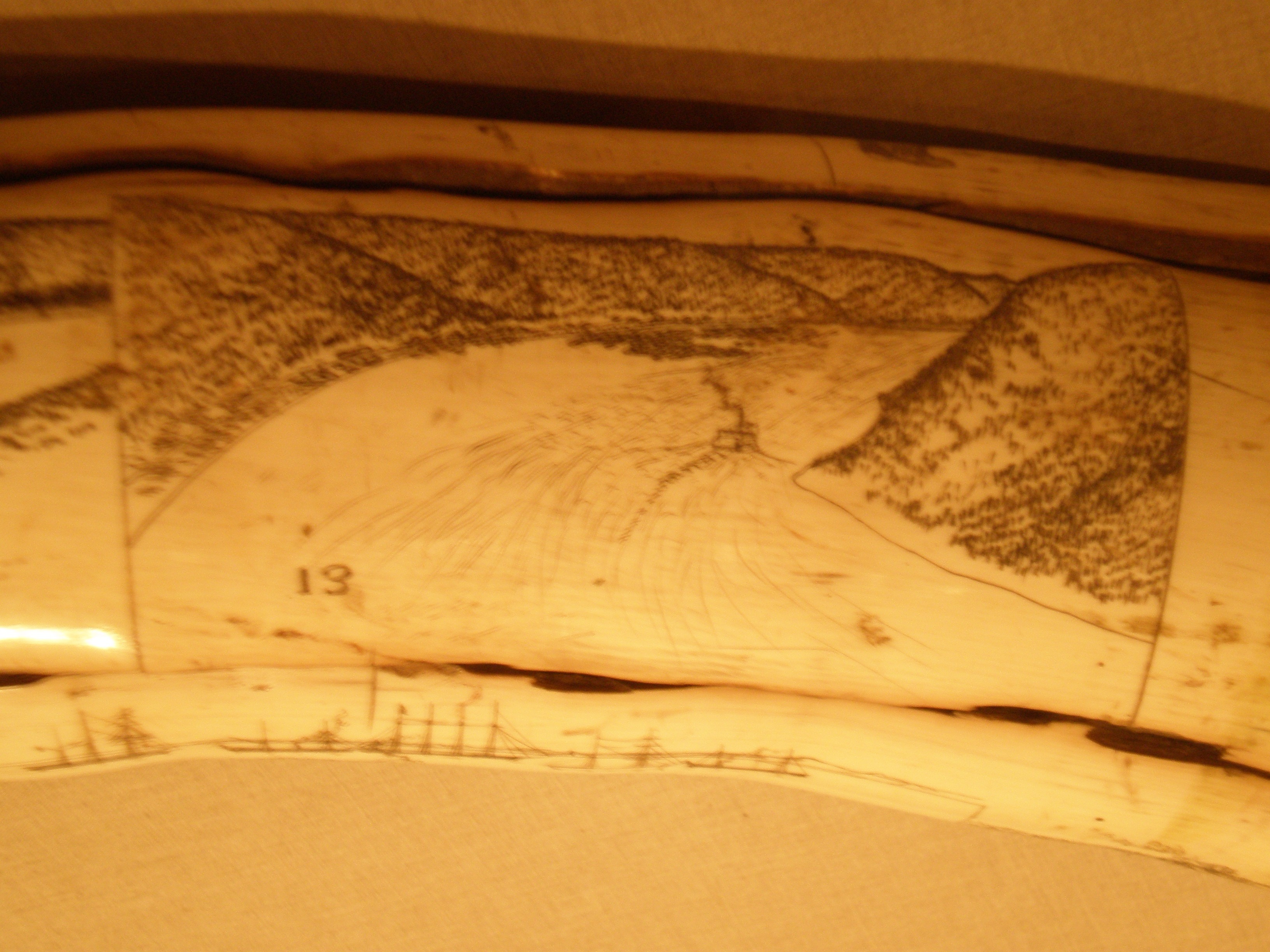
A mammoth tusk with Inuit carvings of scenes on the Yukon River, 19th century, De Young Museum

The woolly mammoth has remained culturally significant long after its extinction. Indigenous peoples of Siberia had long found what is now known to have been woolly mammoth remains, collecting their tusks for the ivory trade, and had a diverse range of mythological interpretations of mammoth remains. The Mansi and the Khanty peoples conceived of mammoths as giant birds, with the Mansi (along with the Nenets) believing that they were responsible for the creation of mountains and lakes. In the mythology of the Evenk people, mammoths were responsible for the world's creation, digging up the land from the ocean floor with their tusks. The Selkup believed that mammoths lived underground and guarded the underworld, while the Yakuts regarded mammoths as water spirits.

The indigenous peoples of North America used woolly mammoth ivory and bone for tools and art. As in Siberia, North American natives had "myths of observation" explaining the remains of woolly mammoths and other elephants; the Bering Strait Inupiat believed the bones came from burrowing creatures, while other peoples associated them with primordial giants or "great beasts". Observers have interpreted legends from several Native American peoples as containing folk memory of extinct elephants, though other scholars are sceptical that folk memory could survive such a long time.

Woolly mammoth tusks had been articles of trade in Asia long before Europeans became acquainted with them. Güyük, the 13th-century Khan of the Mongols, is reputed to have sat on a throne made from mammoth ivory. Inspired by the Siberian natives' concept of the mammoth as an underground creature, it was recorded in the 16th-century Chinese pharmaceutical encyclopedia, Ben Cao Gangmu, as yin shu, "the hidden rodent". Remains of various extinct elephants were known by Europeans for centuries but were generally interpreted as the remains of legendary creatures such as behemoths or giants, based on biblical accounts. They were thought to be remains of modern elephants that had been brought to Europe during the Roman Republic, for example the war elephants of Hannibal and Pyrrhus of Epirus, or animals that had wandered north.

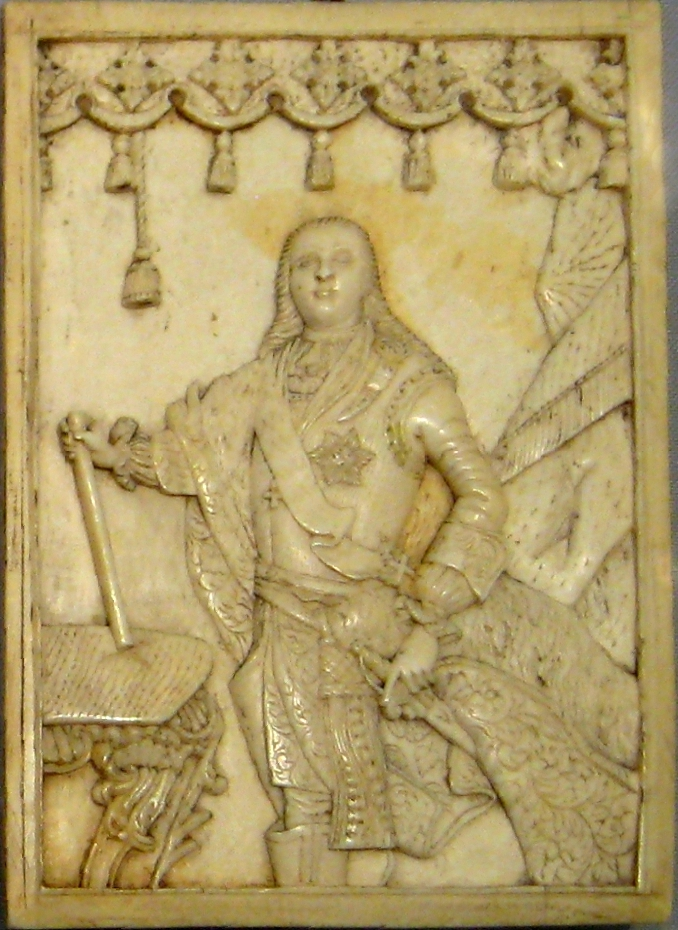
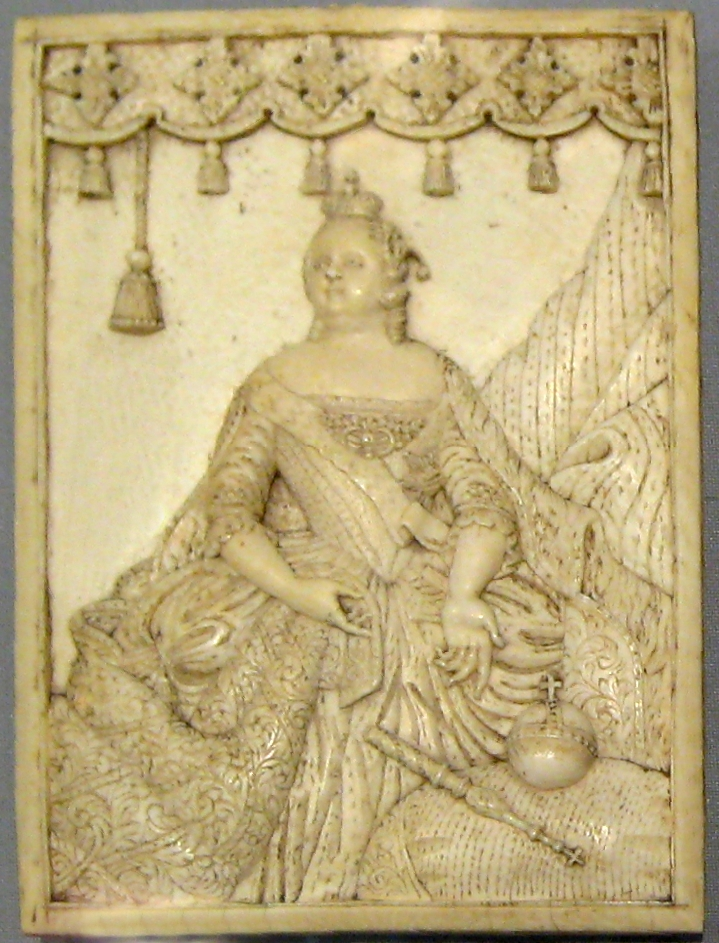
Peter III and Elizabeth of Russia carved in mammoth ivory

Siberian mammoth ivory is reported to have been exported to Russia and Europe in the 10th century. The first Siberian ivory to reach Western Europe was brought to London in 1611. When Russia occupied Siberia, the ivory trade grew and it became a widely exported commodity, with huge amounts being excavated. From the 19th century onwards, woolly mammoth ivory became a highly prized commodity, used as raw material for many products. Today, it is still in great demand as a replacement for the now-banned export of elephant ivory and has been referred to as "white gold". Local dealers estimate that 10 million mammoths are still frozen in Siberia. Conservationists have proposed that these mammoths could help prevent the extinction of living elephant species. Elephants are often hunted by poachers for their ivory, but if the demand for ivory could be met by sourcing it from the already extinct mammoths, it might reduce the pressure on elephants. Trade in elephant ivory has been forbidden in most places following the 1989 Lausanne Conference, but dealers have been known to label it as mammoth ivory to get it through customs. Mammoth ivory looks similar to elephant ivory, but the former is browner, and the Schreger lines are coarser in texture. In the 21st century, global warming has made access to Siberian tusks easier since the permafrost thaws more quickly, exposing the mammoths embedded within it.

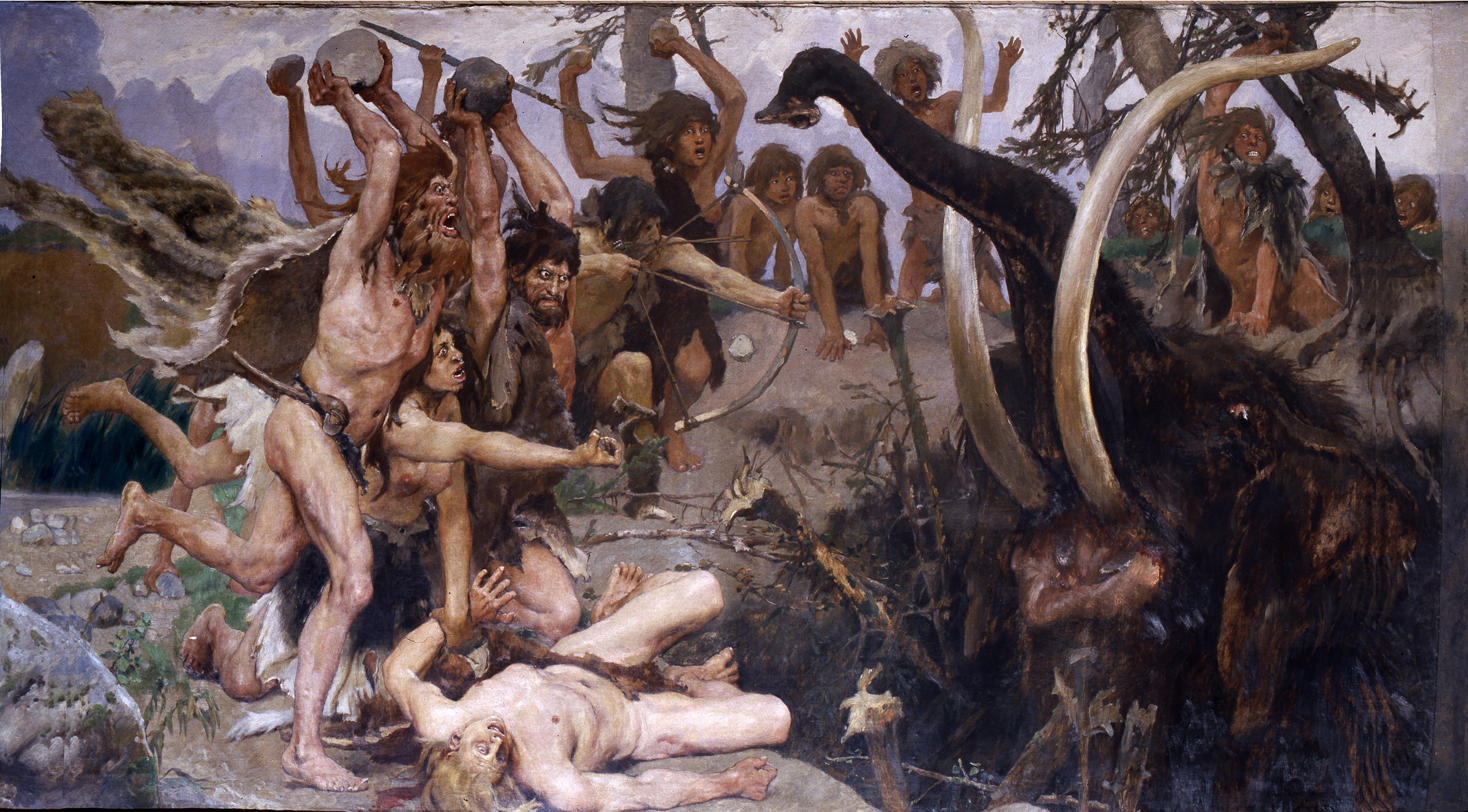
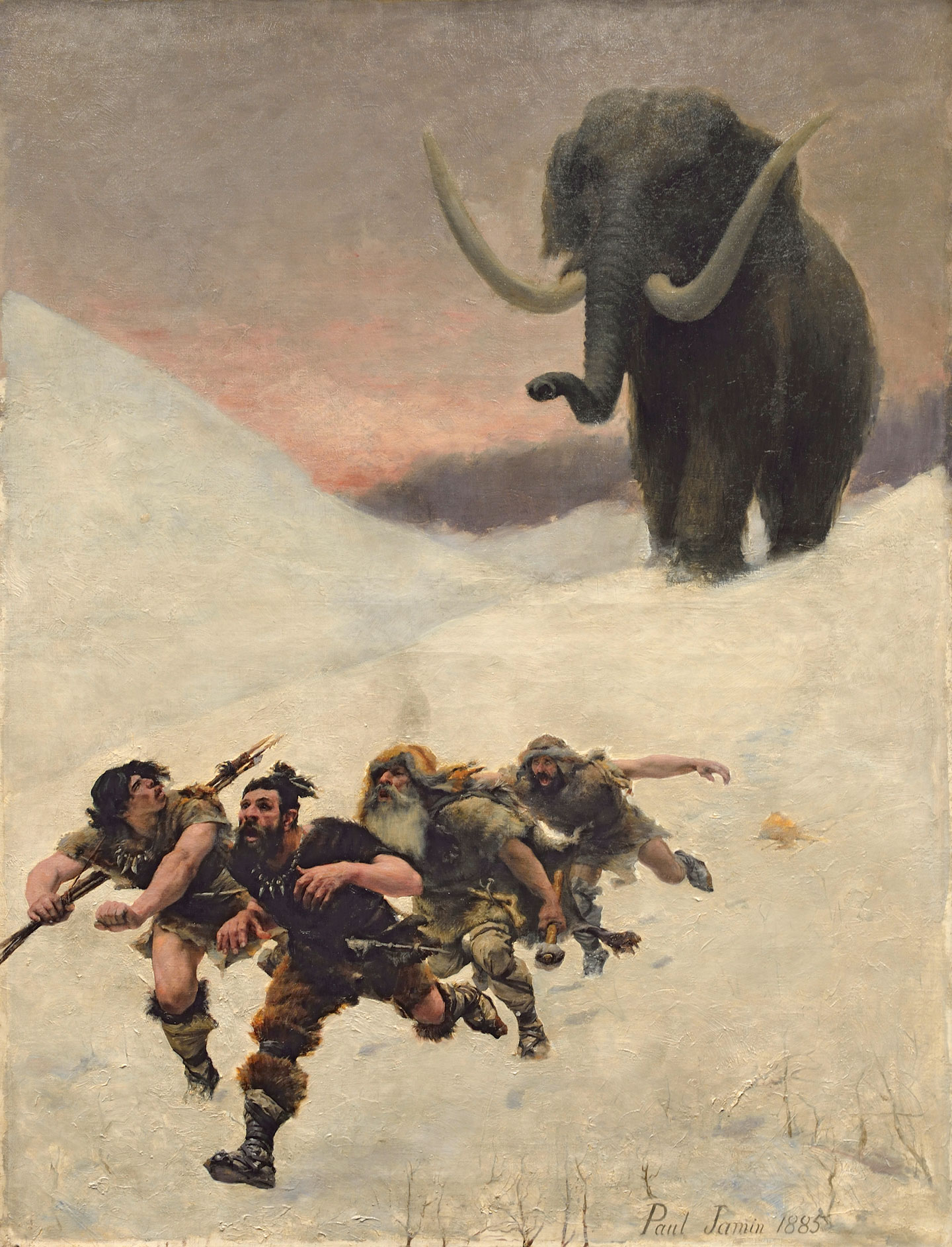
1880s artworks depicting humans in conflict with woolly mammoths, by Viktor Vasnetsov (left) and Paul Jamin

Stories abound about frozen woolly mammoth meat consumed once defrosted, especially that of the "Berezovka mammoth", but most of these are considered dubious. In most cases, the carcasses were decayed, and the stench so unbearable that only wild scavengers and the dogs accompanying the finders showed any interest in the flesh. Such meat apparently was once recommended against illness in China, and Siberian natives have occasionally cooked the meat of frozen carcasses they discovered. According to one of the more famous stories, members of the Explorers Club dined on the meat of a frozen mammoth from Alaska in 1951. In 2016, a group of researchers genetically examined a sample of the meal and found it to belong to a green sea turtle (it had also been claimed to belong to Megatherium). The researchers concluded that the dinner had been a publicity stunt. In 2011, the Chinese palaeontologist Lida Xing livestreamed while eating meat from a Siberian mammoth leg (thoroughly cooked and flavoured with salt) and told his audience it tasted bad and like soil. This triggered controversy and gained mixed reactions, but Xing stated he did it to promote science. In 2023, an Australian cultured meat start-up, Vow, revealed a lab-grown "mammoth meatball" produced using a DNA sequence from the woolly mammoth. The meatball sparked conversations about the potential of cultured meat as a sustainable food source, highlighting its environmental benefits compared to traditional agriculture.

=== Alleged survival ===
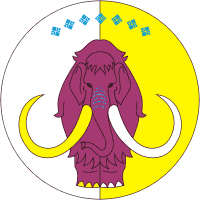
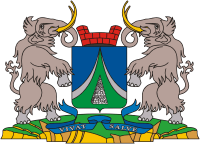
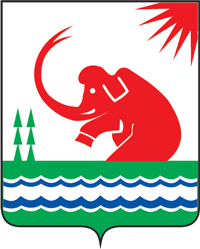
Woolly mammoths represented on the coats of arms of regions in Russia and Ukraine

There have been occasional claims that the woolly mammoth is not extinct and that small, isolated herds might survive in the vast and sparsely inhabited tundra of the Northern Hemisphere. In the 19th century, several reports of "large shaggy beasts" were passed on to the Russian authorities by Siberian tribesmen, but no scientific proof ever surfaced. A French chargé d'affaires working in Vladivostok, M. Gallon, said in 1946 that in 1920, he had met a Russian fur-trapper who claimed to have seen living giant, furry "elephants" deep into the taiga. Due to the large area of Siberia, the possibility that woolly mammoths survived into more recent times cannot be completely ruled out, but evidence indicates that they became extinct thousands of years ago. These natives had likely gained their knowledge of woolly mammoths from carcasses they encountered, which is likely the source of their legends of the animal.

In the late 19th century, rumours existed about surviving mammoths in Alaska. In 1899, Henry Tukeman detailed his killing of a mammoth in Alaska and his subsequent donation of the specimen to the Smithsonian Institution in Washington, DC. The museum denied the story. The Swedish writer Bengt Sjögren suggested in 1962 that the myth began when the American biologist Charles Haskins Townsend travelled in Alaska, saw Inuit trading mammoth tusks, asked if mammoths were still living in Alaska, and provided them with a drawing of the animal. Bernard Heuvelmans included the possibility of residual populations of Siberian mammoths in his 1955 book, On The Track Of Unknown Animals; while his book was a systematic investigation into possible unknown species, it became the basis of the cryptozoology movement.
