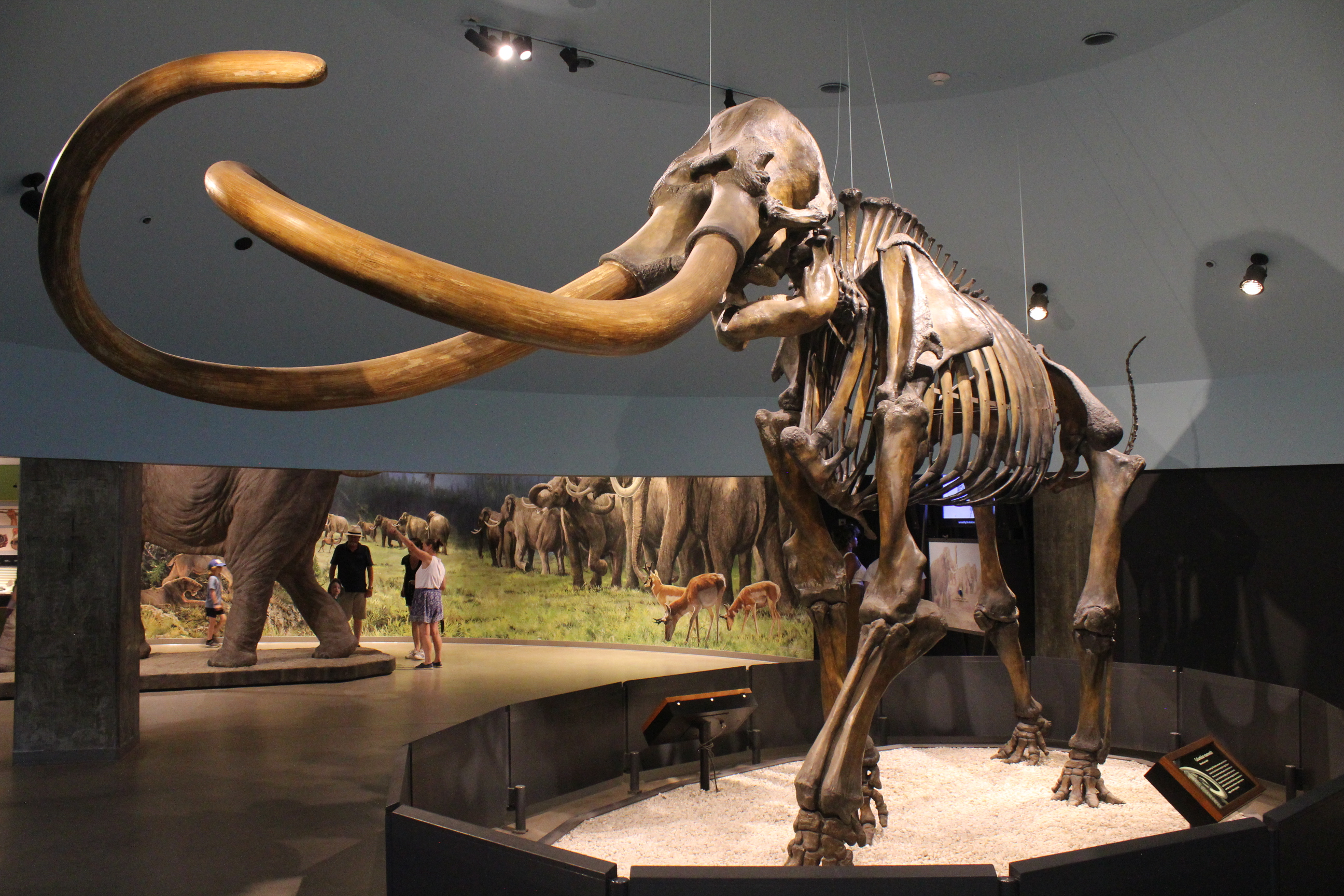
- Composite male skeleton in the George C. Page Museum at the La Brea Tar Pits

Scientific classification
- Kingdom: Animalia
- Phylum: Chordata
- Class: Mammalia
- Order: Proboscidea
- Family: Elephantidae
- Genus: †Mammuthus
- Species: †M. columbi

Binomial name
- †Mammuthus columbi (Falconer, 1857)
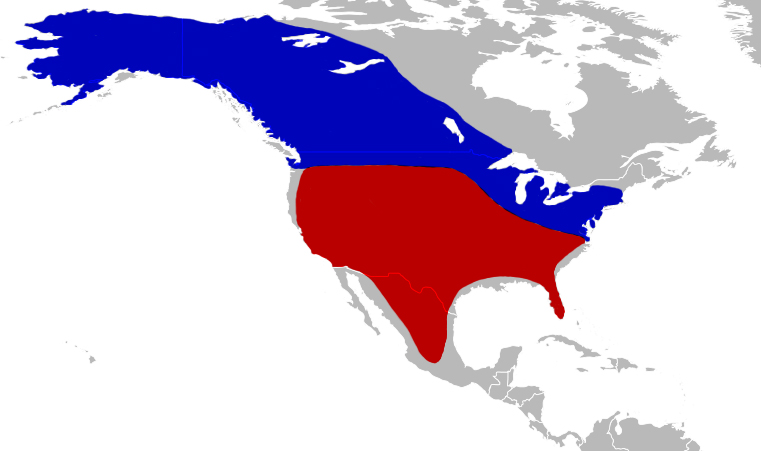
- Approximate North American ranges of the Columbian mammoth (red) and woolly mammoth (blue) during the Late Pleistocene inferred from fossil finds

Synonyms
- List: Elephas jacksoni Mather, 1838; Mammuthus jacksoni Mather, 1838; Parelephas jacksoni Mather, 1838; Elephas columbi Falconer, 1857; Euelephas columbi Falconer, 1857; Parelephas columbi Falconer, 1857; Mammuthus (Parelephas) columbi Falconer, 1857; Elephas primigenius columbii Falconer, 1857; Elephas texianus Owen, 1858; Elephas imperator Leidy, 1858; Mammuthus imperator Leidy, 1858; Euelephas imperator Leidy, 1858; Archidiskodon imperator Leidy, 1858; Mammuthus (Archidiskodon) imperator Leidy, 1858; Elephas jeffersonii Osborn, 1922; Parelephas jeffersonii Osborn, 1922; Mammuthus jeffersonii Osborn, 1922; Elephas roosevelti Hay, 1922; Parelephas roosevelti Hay, 1922; Elephas washingtonii Osborn, 1923; Parelephas washingtonii Osborn, 1923; Elephas maibeni Barbour, 1925; Elephas eellsi Hay, 1926; Elephas floridanus Osborn, 1929; Parelephas floridanus Osborn, 1929; Mammuthus floridanus Osborn, 1929; Archidiskodon sonoriensis Osborn, 1929; Parelephas progressus Osborn, 1942

= Columbian mammoth =

Columbian mammoth Temporal range: Early Pleistocene to Late Pleistocene, 1.5–0.012 Ma

Extinct species of mammoth that inhabited North America

The Columbian mammoth (Mammuthus columbi) is an extinct species of mammoth that inhabited North America from southern Canada to Costa Rica during the Pleistocene epoch. The Columbian mammoth descended from Eurasian steppe mammoths that colonized North America during the Early Pleistocene around 1.5–1.3 million years ago, and later experienced hybridisation with the woolly mammoth lineage. The Columbian mammoth was among the last mammoth species, and the pygmy mammoths evolved from them on the Channel Islands of California. The closest extant relative of the Columbian and other mammoths is the Asian elephant.

Reaching 3.72–4.2 m (12.2–13.8 ft) at the shoulders and 9.2–12.5 t (9.1–12.3 long tons; 10.1–13.8 short tons) in weight, the Columbian mammoth was one of the largest species of mammoth, larger than the woolly mammoth and the African bush elephant. It had long, curved tusks and four molars at a time, which were replaced six times during the lifetime of an individual. It most likely used its tusks and trunk like modern elephants—for manipulating objects, fighting, and foraging. Bones, hair, dung, and stomach contents have been discovered, but no preserved carcasses are known. The Columbian mammoth preferred open areas, such as parkland landscapes, and fed on sedges, grasses, and other plants. It did not live in the Arctic regions of Canada, which were instead inhabited by woolly mammoths. The ranges of the two species may have overlapped, and genetic evidence suggests that they interbred. Several sites contain the skeletons of multiple Columbian mammoths, either because they died in incidents such as a drought, or because these locations were natural traps in which individuals accumulated over time.

For a few thousand years prior to their extinction, Columbian mammoths coexisted in North America with Paleoindians – the first humans to inhabit the Americas – who hunted them for food, used their bones for making tools, and possibly depicted them in ancient art. Columbian mammoth remains have been found in association with Clovis culture artifacts. The Clovis peoples are suggested to have been specialized mammoth hunters, though they possibly also scavenged their remains. The last Columbian mammoths are dated to about ~12,000 years ago, with the species becoming extinct as part of the Late Pleistocene extinction event, simultaneously with most other large megafaunal mammals present in the Americas. It is one of the last recorded North American megafauna to have gone extinct. The extinction of the Columbian mammoth and other American megafauna was most likely a result of habitat loss caused by climate change, hunting by humans, or a combination of both.

== Taxonomy ==
Around 1725, enslaved Africans digging in the vicinity of the Stono River in South Carolina unearthed 3-4 molar teeth now known to have belonged to Columbian mammoths, which were subsequently examined by the British naturalist Mark Catesby, who visited the site, and published his account of the visit in 1743. While the slave owners were puzzled by the objects and suggested that they originated from the great flood described in the Bible, Catesby noted that the slaves unanimously agreed that the objects were in fact the teeth of elephants, similar to those of African elephants that they were familiar with from their homeland, to which Catesby concurred, marking the first technical identification of any fossil animal in North America. A similar observation was made in 1782 after enslaved Africans had excavated mammoth bones and teeth from a salt marsh in Virginia. These remains were subsequently sent on by US army commander Arthur Campbell to future US president Thomas Jefferson. Campbell noted in a letter that several Africans had seen one of the teeth, and "All ... pronounced it an elephant." Catesby's account was later noted by the French paleontologist Georges Cuvier around the beginning of the 19th century, with Cuvier personally examining the teeth from Stono, which he used to support his theory of catastrophism.

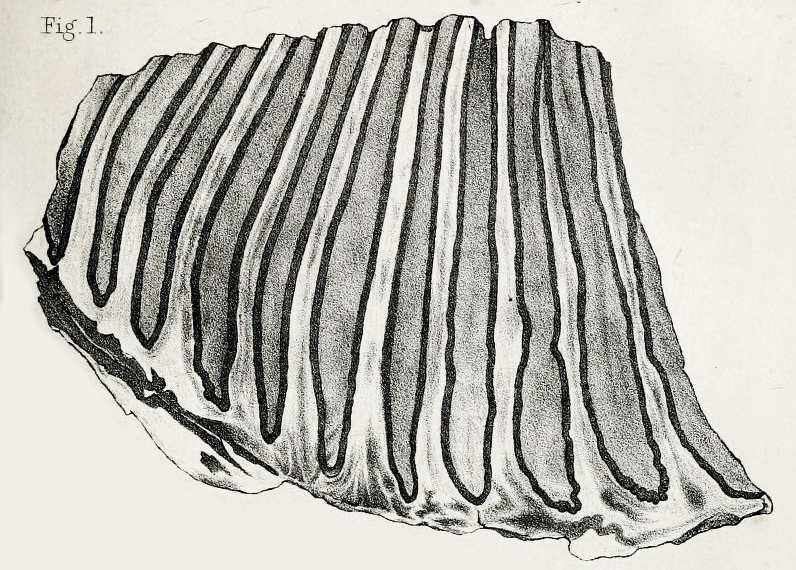
1863 lithograph of the partial holotype molar from Georgia

The Columbian mammoth was first scientifically described in 1857 by the Scottish naturalist Hugh Falconer, who named the species Elephas columbi after the explorer Christopher Columbus. The animal was brought to Falconer's attention in 1846 by the Scottish geologist Charles Lyell, who sent him molar fragments found during the 1838 excavation of the Brunswick–Altamaha Canal in Georgia, in the southeastern United States. At the time, similar fossils from across North America were attributed to woolly mammoths (then Elephas primigenius). Falconer found that his specimens were distinct, confirming his conclusion by examining their internal structure and studying additional molars from Mexico. Although scientists William Phipps Blake and Richard Owen believed that E. texianus was more appropriate for the species, Falconer rejected the name; he also suggested that E. imperator and E. jacksoni, two other American elephants described from molars, were based on remains too fragmentary to classify properly. More complete material that may be from the same quarry as Falconer's fragmentary holotype molar (which is cataloged as specimen BMNH 40769 at the British Museum of Natural History) was reported in 2012, and could help shed more light on that specimen, since doubts about its adequacy as a holotype have been raised.

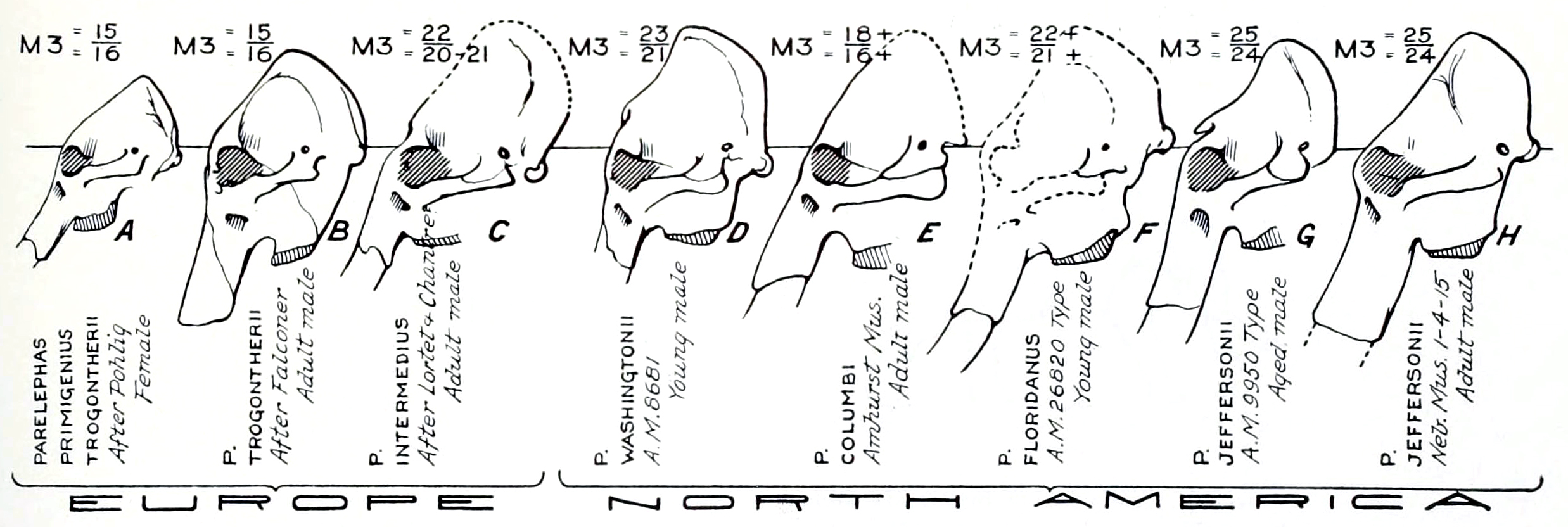
Henry F. Osborn's 1942 diagram of evolutionarily "progressive" mammoth skulls of species he grouped in the genus Parelephas; the North American species are now considered junior synonyms of M. columbi

In the early 20th century, the taxonomy of extinct elephants became increasingly complicated. In 1942, the American paleontologist Henry Fairfield Osborn's posthumous monograph on the Proboscidea was published, wherein he used various generic and subgeneric names that had previously been proposed for extinct elephant species, such as Archidiskodon, Metarchidiskodon, Parelephas, and Mammonteus. Osborn also retained names for many regional and intermediate subspecies or "varieties", and created recombinations such as Parelephas columbi felicis and Archidiskodon imperator maibeni.

The taxonomic situation was simplified by various researchers from the 1970s onwards; all species of mammoth were retained in the genus Mammuthus, and many proposed differences between species were instead interpreted as intraspecific variation. In 2003, the American paleontologist Larry Agenbroad reviewed opinions about North American mammoth taxonomy, and concluded that several species had been declared junior synonyms, and that M. columbi (the Columbian mammoth) and M. exilis (the pygmy mammoth) were the only species of mammoth endemic to the Americas (as other species lived both there and in Eurasia). The idea that species such as M. imperator (the imperial mammoth) and M. jeffersoni (Jefferson's mammoth) were either more primitive or advanced stages in Columbian mammoth evolution was largely dismissed, and they were regarded as synonyms. In spite of these conclusions, Agenbroad cautioned that American mammoth taxonomy is not yet fully resolved.

=== Evolution ===
The earliest known members of Proboscidea, the clade that contains the elephants, existed about 55 million years ago around the Tethys Sea area. The closest living relatives of the Proboscidea are the sirenians (dugongs and manatees) and the hyraxes (an order of small, herbivorous mammals). The family Elephantidae existed six million years ago in Africa, and includes the living elephants and the mammoths. Among many now extinct clades, the mastodon (Mammut) is only a distant relative, and part of the distinct family Mammutidae, which diverged 25 million years before the mammoths evolved. The Asian elephant (Elephas maximus) is the closest extant relative of the mammoths. The following cladogram shows the placement of the Columbian mammoth among other Late Pleistocene proboscideans, based on genetic studies:

- - Mammutidae
    †Mammut americanum (American mastodon)
  - Elephantida
    - Gomphotheriidae
      †Notiomastodon platensis (South American gomphothere)
    - Elephantidae
      - - - †Mammuthus columbi (Columbian mammoth)
          - †Mammuthus primigenius (woolly mammoth)
        - - Elephas maximus (Asian elephant)
      - Loxodonta (African elephants) + †Palaeoloxodon antiquus (straight-tusked elephant)

2009 Voice of America report about the excavation of a male specimen nicknamed "Zed" from the La Brea Tar Pits

Since many remains of each species of mammoth are known from several localities, reconstructing the evolutionary history of the genus is possible through morphological studies. Mammoth species can be identified from the number of enamel ridges (or lamellar plates) on their molars; primitive species had few ridges, and the number increased gradually as new species evolved to feed on more abrasive food items. The crowns of the teeth became taller in height and the skulls became taller to accommodate this. At the same time, the skulls became shorter from front to back to reduce the weight of the head. The short, tall skulls of woolly and Columbian mammoths are the culmination of this process.

The first known members of the genus Mammuthus are the African species M. subplanifrons from the Pliocene, and M. africanavus from the Pleistocene. The former is thought to be the ancestor of later forms. Mammoths entered Europe around 3 million years ago. The earliest European mammoth has been named M. rumanus; it spread across Europe and China. Only its molars are known, which show that it had 8–10 enamel ridges. A population evolved 12–14 ridges, splitting off from and replacing the earlier type, becoming M. meridionalis about 2.0–1.7 million years ago. In turn, this species was replaced by the steppe mammoth (M. trogontherii) with 18–20 ridges, which evolved in eastern Asia around 2.0–1.5 million years ago. The Columbian mammoth evolved from a population of M. trogontherii that had crossed the Bering Strait and entered North America about 1.5-1.3 million years ago; it retained a similar number of molar ridges. Mammoths derived from M. trogontherii evolved molars with 26 ridges 400,000 years ago in Siberia and became the woolly mammoth (M. primigenius). Woolly mammoths entered North America about 100,000 years ago.

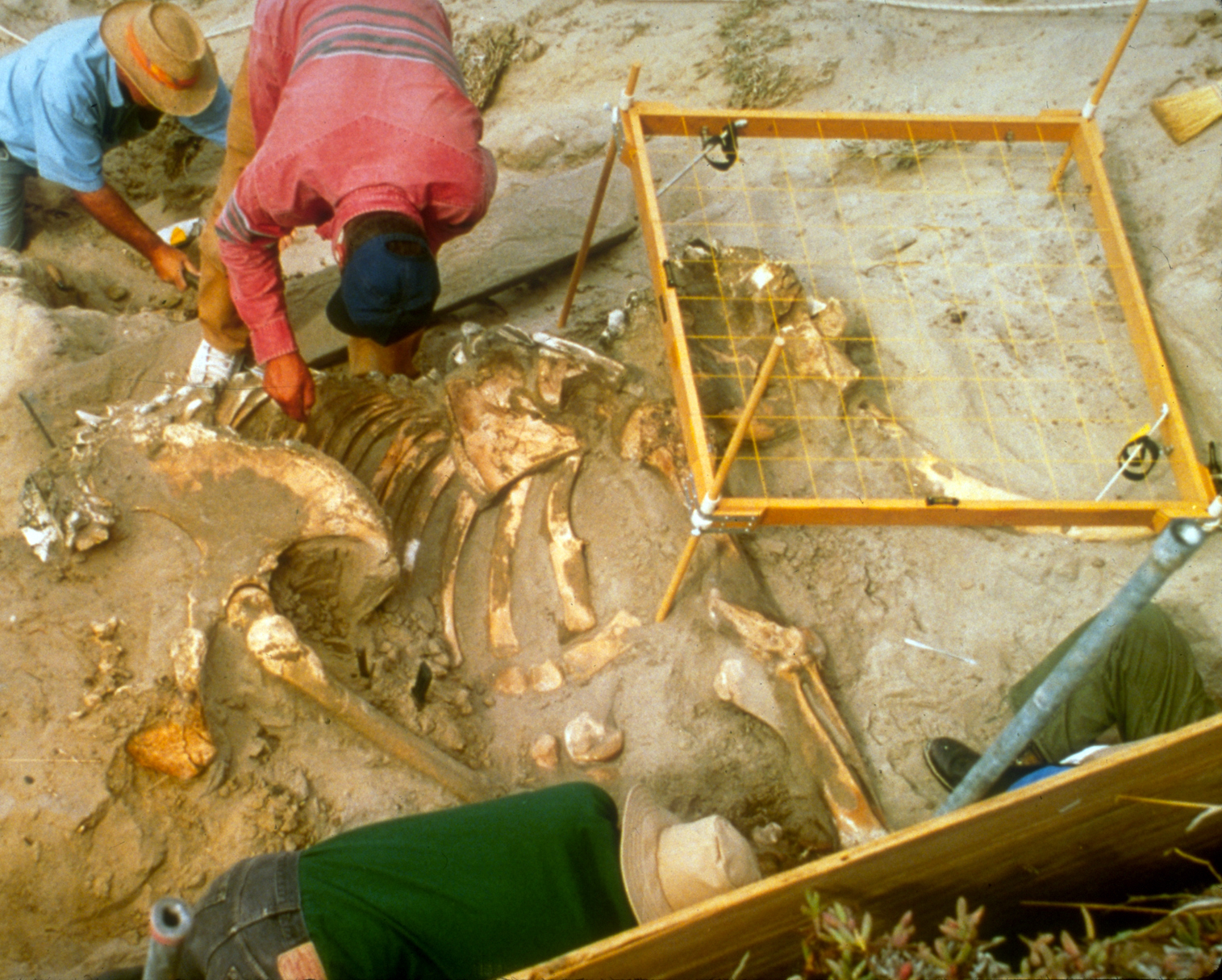
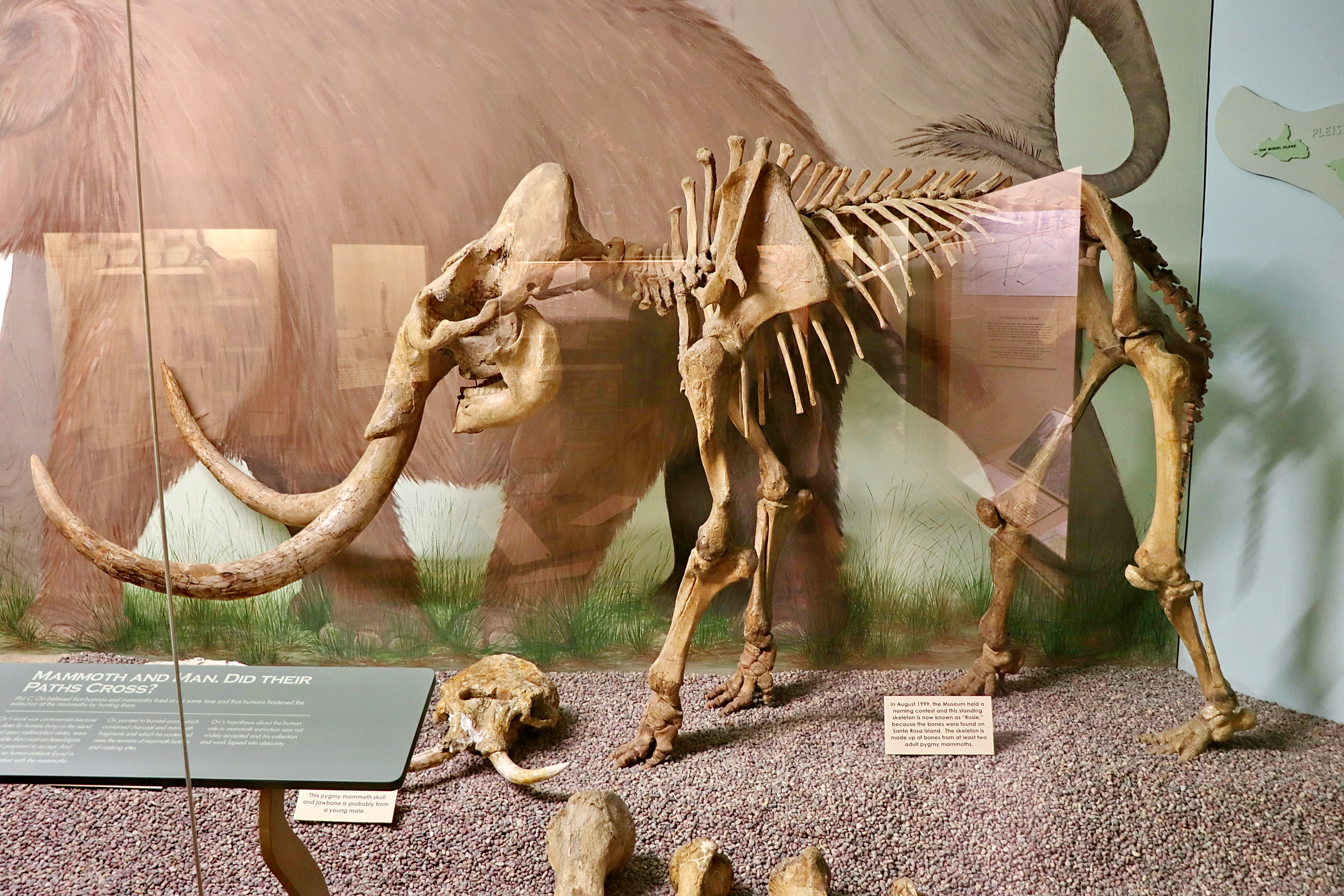
Excavation and skeleton of a pygmy mammoth, which evolved from Columbian mammoths on the Channel Islands

A population of mammoths derived from Columbian mammoths that lived between 80,000 and 13,000 years ago on the Channel Islands of California, 10 km (6.2 mi) away from the mainland, evolved to be less than half the size of the mainland Columbian mammoths. They are, therefore, considered to be the distinct species M. exilis, the pygmy mammoth (or a subspecies, M. c. exilis). These mammoths presumably reached the islands by swimming there when sea levels were lower, and decreased in size due to the limited food provided by the islands' small areas. Bones of larger specimens have also been found on the islands, but whether these were stages in the dwarfing process, or later arrivals of Columbian mammoths is unknown.

=== Hybridization ===
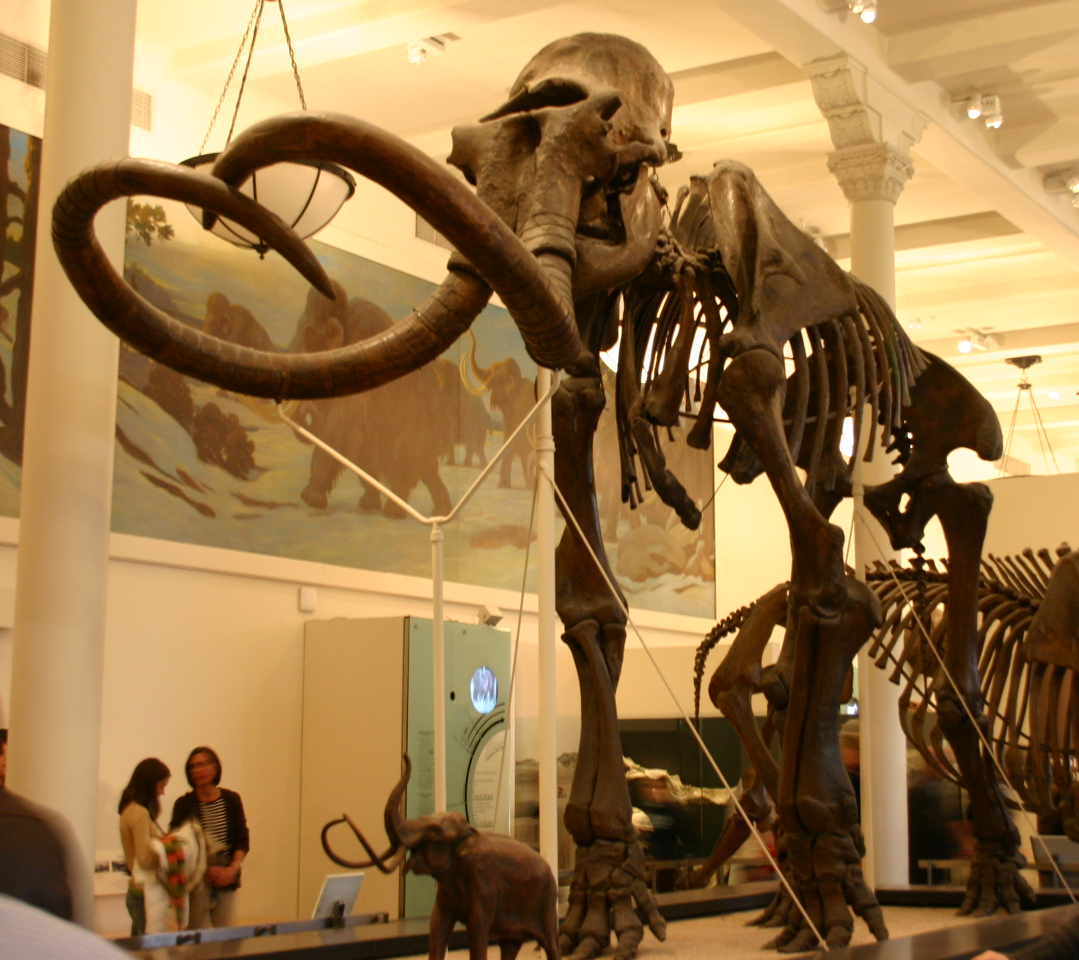
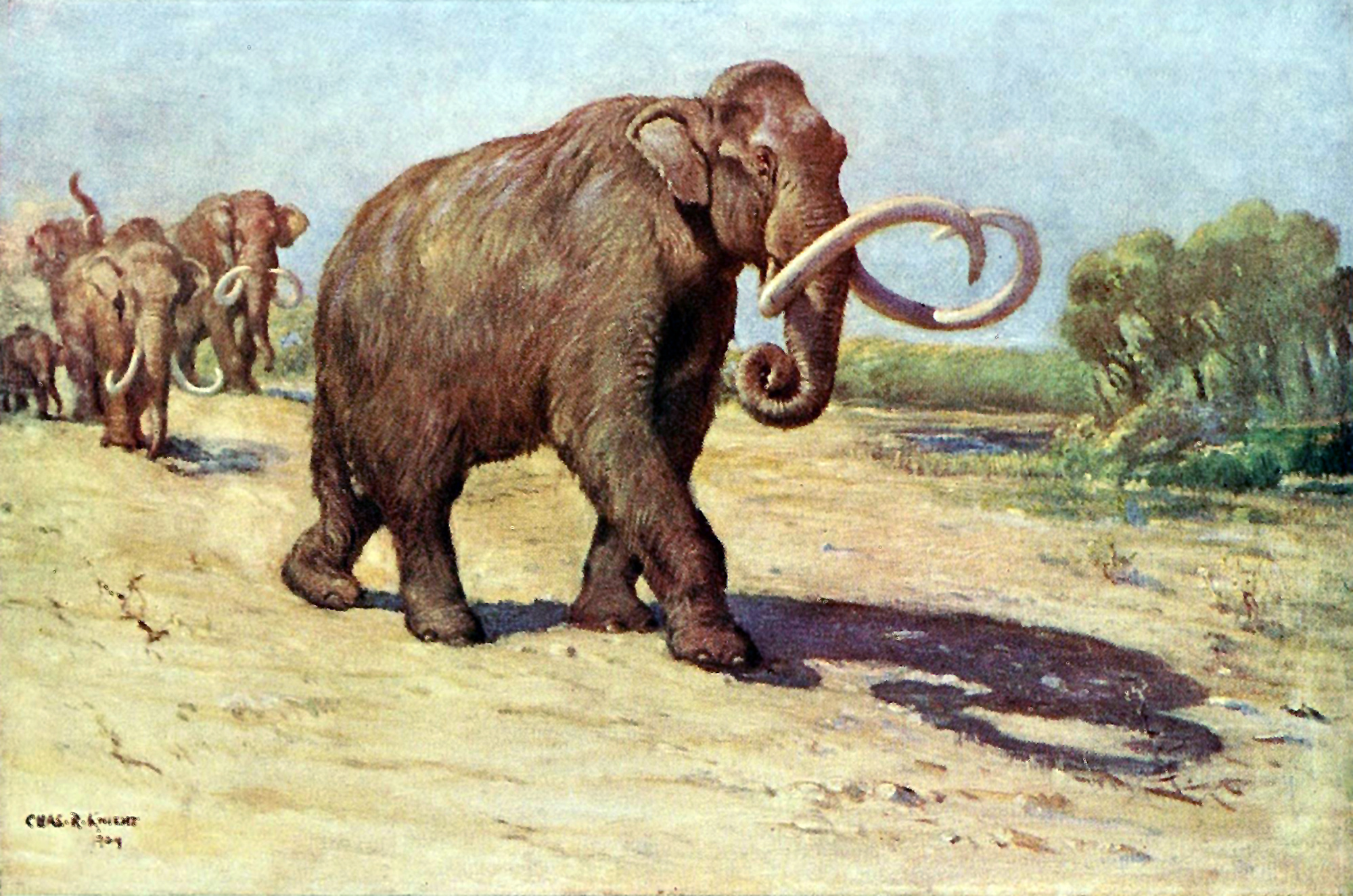
Specimen formerly assigned to the junior synonym M. jeffersonii, now suggested to be a hybrid between Columbian and woolly mammoths, at the American Museum of Natural History (left), and 1909 life restoration by Charles R. Knight based on the same specimen

A 2011 ancient DNA study of the complete mitochondrial genome (inherited through the female line) showed that two examined Columbian mammoths, including the morphologically typical "Huntington mammoth", were grouped within a subclade of woolly mammoths. This suggests that the two populations interbred and produced fertile offspring. One possible explanation is introgression of a haplogroup from woolly to Columbian mammoths, or vice versa. A similar situation has been documented in modern species of African elephant (Loxodonta), the African bush elephant (L. africana) and the African forest elephant (L. cyclotis). The authors of the study also suggest that the North American type formerly referred to as M. jeffersonii may have been a hybrid between the two species, as it is apparently morphologically intermediate. These findings were unexpected, and other researchers requested further study to clarify the situation.

A 2015 study of mammoth molars confirmed that M. columbi evolved from Eurasian M. trogontherii, not M. meridionalis as had been suggested earlier, and noted that M. columbi and M. trogontherii were so similar in morphology that their classification as separate species may be questionable. The study also suggested that the animals in the range where M. columbi and M. primigenius overlapped formed a metapopulation of hybrids with varying morphology. In 2016, a genetic study of North American mammoth specimens confirmed that the mitochondrial diversity of M. columbi was nested within that of M. primigenius and suggested that both species interbred extensively, were both descended from M. trogontherii, and concluded that morphological differences between fossils may, therefore, not be reliable for determining taxonomy. The authors also questioned whether M. columbi and M. primigenius should be considered "good species", considering that they were able to interbreed after supposedly being separated for a million years, but cautioned that more specimens need to be sampled.

Phylogeny of mammoths after a 2021 study, showing the relationship between the Columbian mammoth and woolly mammoth, as well as early steppe mammoth-like Siberian mammoths, demonstrating significant introgressive gene flow from the woolly mammoth into the Columbian mammoth

In 2021, DNA older than a million years was sequenced for the first time, from two steppe mammoth-like teeth of Early Pleistocene age found in eastern Siberia. One tooth from Adyocha (1-1.3 million years old) belonged to a lineage that was ancestral to later woolly mammoths, whereas the other from Krestovka (1.1–1.65 million years old) belonged to new lineage, possibly a distinct species, that is estimated to have split from the ancestors of woolly mammoths around 2.7-1.8 million years ago. The study found that a large proportion of the ancestry of Columbian mammoths came from the Krestovka lineage, which were probably representative of the first mammoths to have colonized North America, and another substantial contribution coming from early representatives of the woolly mammoth lineage, with the hybridisation between the two lineages likely happening at least 420,000 years ago, during the Middle Pleistocene, resulting in the Columbian mammoths of the Late Pleistocene having around 40-50% ancestry from the Krestovka lineage, and 50-60% related to woolly mammoths. Later woolly and Columbian mammoths also interbred occasionally, and mammoth species perhaps hybridized routinely when brought together by glacial expansion. The study also found that genetic adaptations to cold environments, such as hair growth and fat deposits, were already present in the steppe mammoth lineage, and was not unique to woolly mammoths. This research has raised questions about which material the name Mammuthus columbi should be applied to, as there is no obvious difference in tooth morphology between Early Pleistocene presumably pre-hybridisation North American mammoths and later Pleistocene M. columbi. In a 2024 review, Adrian Lister and Love Dalén argued that M. columbi should be retained in a broad sense covering the entire time-period of mammoth occupation of North America.

A 2025 study found that two genetically sequenced molar teeth of Late Pleistocene age in British Columbia, Canada, belonged to mammoths of predominantly woolly mammoth ancestry, but harbored significant levels (21.6 ± 0.9% and 34.6 ± 0.1%) of Columbian mammoth ancestry, indicating interbreeding and bidirectional gene flow between Columbian mammoths and woolly mammoths during the Late Pleistocene in North America where their ranges overlapped, rather than just undirectional woolly mammoth gene flow into Columbian mammoths as had previously been recognized. Another 2025 study examining M. columbi from the Valley of Mexico doubled the number of known mitochondrial genomes, and revealed that Mexican M. columbi possessed a highly divergent mitochondrial lineage (with diverse sub-lineages), which was separate to the mitochondrial lineages present in both woolly and Columbian mammoths in northern America. The last common ancestor between Mexican and northern American mammoths was 361,000 years ago (shortly after diverging from Eurasian woolly mammoths), while the divergence date between Columbian and woolly mammoths in northern America was 247,000 years ago.

== Description ==
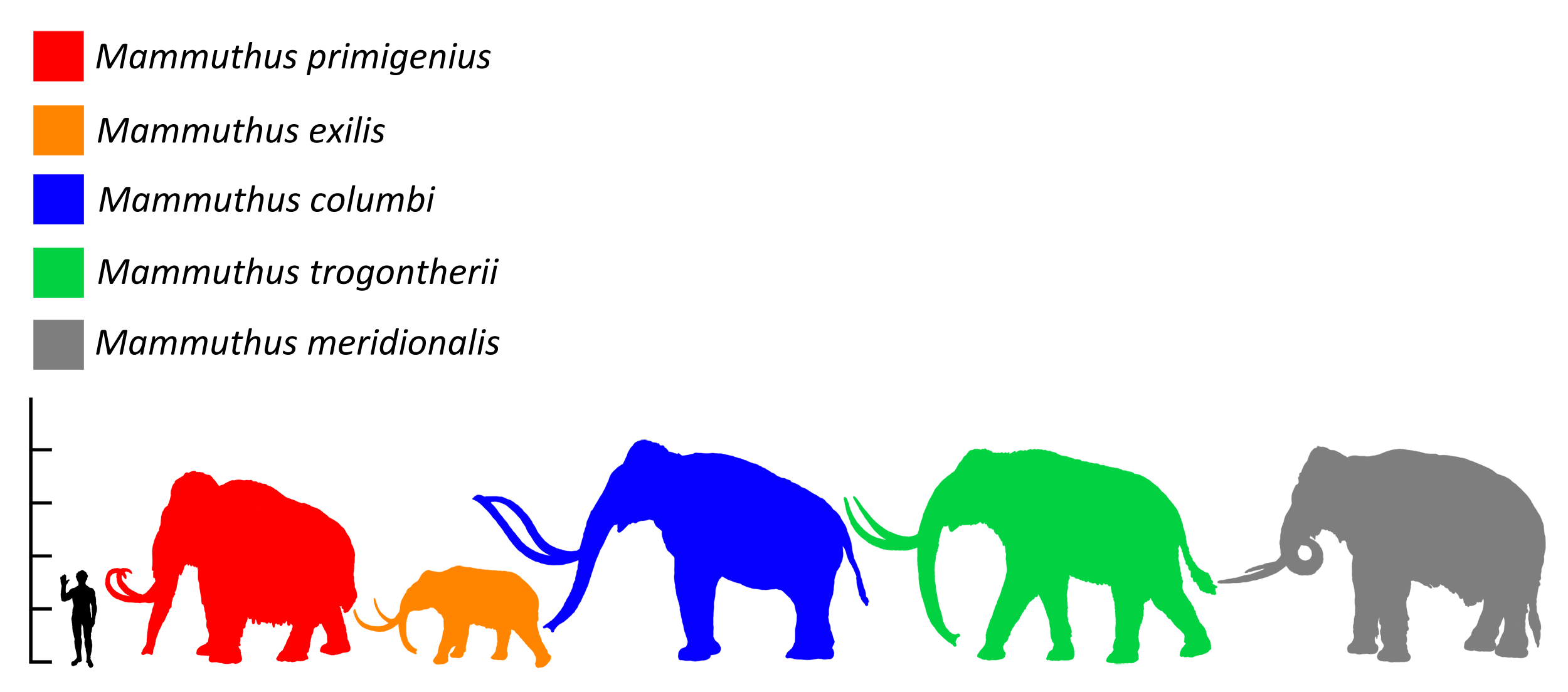
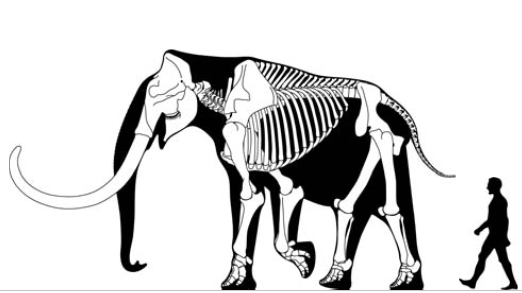
Size of a Columbian mammoth (in blue) compared to a human and other mammoths (left) and a skeletal diagram of a 3.7 m (12 ft) tall male compared to a human (right)

The average male Columbian mammoth is estimated to have had a shoulder height of 3.75 m (12 ft 4 in) and a weight of 9.5 t (9.3 long tons; 10.5 short tons), though large males may have reached 4.2–4.27 m (13 ft 9 in – 14 ft 0 in) in shoulder height and 12.5 t (12.3 long tons; 13.8 short tons) in weight. Specimen DMNH 1359 is estimated to be 55 years old, stands 3.72 m (12 ft 2 in) tall at the shoulder and weighs 9.2 t (9.1 long tons; 10.1 short tons). This mammoth was about the same size or somewhat smaller than the earlier mammoth species M. meridionalis and M. trogontherii, but was larger than the modern African bush elephant and the woolly mammoth, both of which reached about 2.67 to 3.5 m (8 ft 9 in to 11 ft 6 in) at the shoulder. Males were generally larger and more robust. The best indication of sex is the size of the pelvic girdle, since the opening that functions as the birth canal is always wider in females than in males. Like other mammoths, the Columbian mammoth had a high, single-domed head and a sloping back with a high shoulder hump; this shape resulted from the spinous processes (protrusions) of the back vertebrae decreasing in length from front to rear. Juveniles, though, had convex backs like Asian elephants. Other skeletal features include a short, deep rostrum (front part of the jaws), a rounded mandibular symphysis (where the two halves of the lower jaw connected) and the coronoid process of the mandible (upper protrusion of the jaw bone) extending above the molar surfaces.

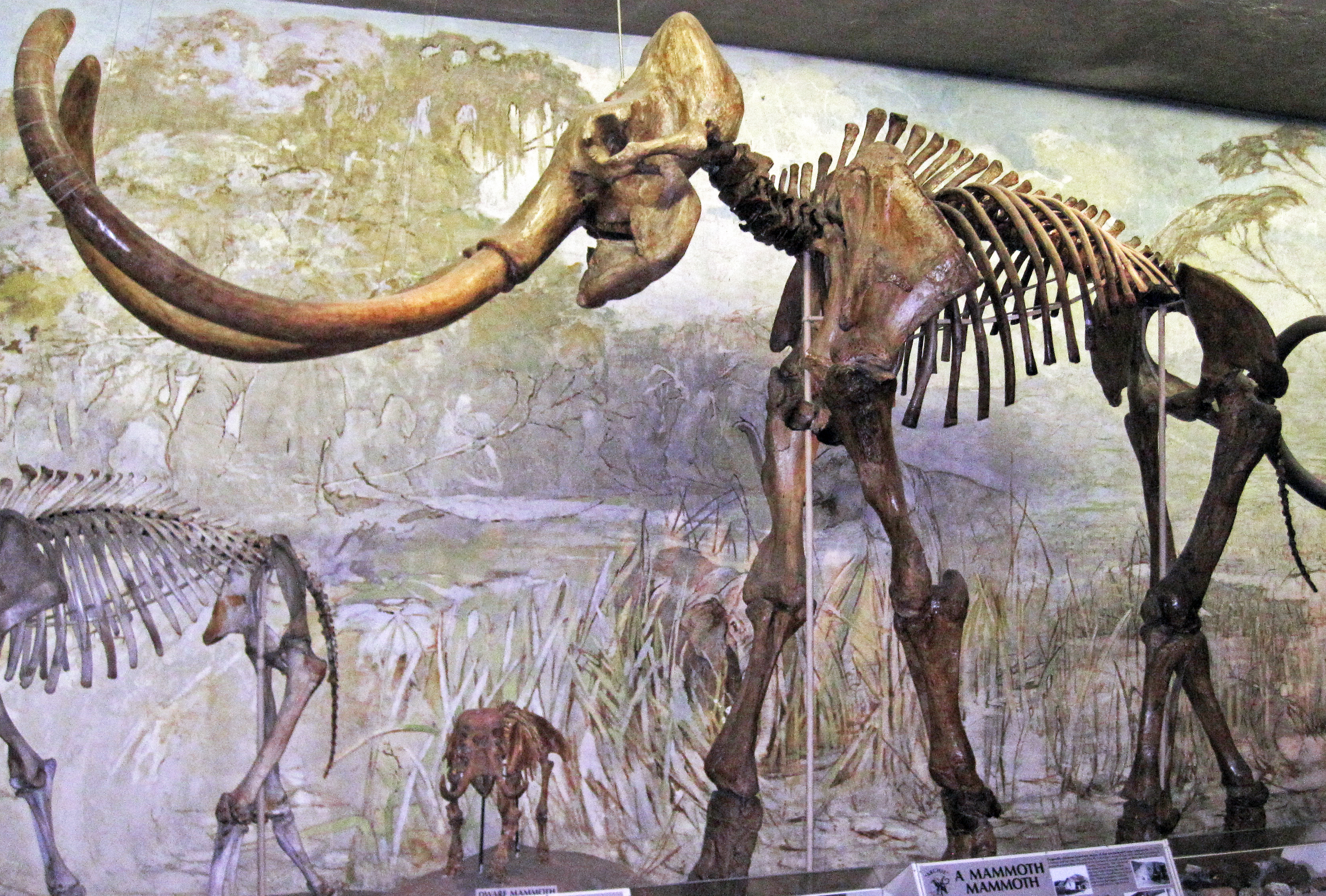
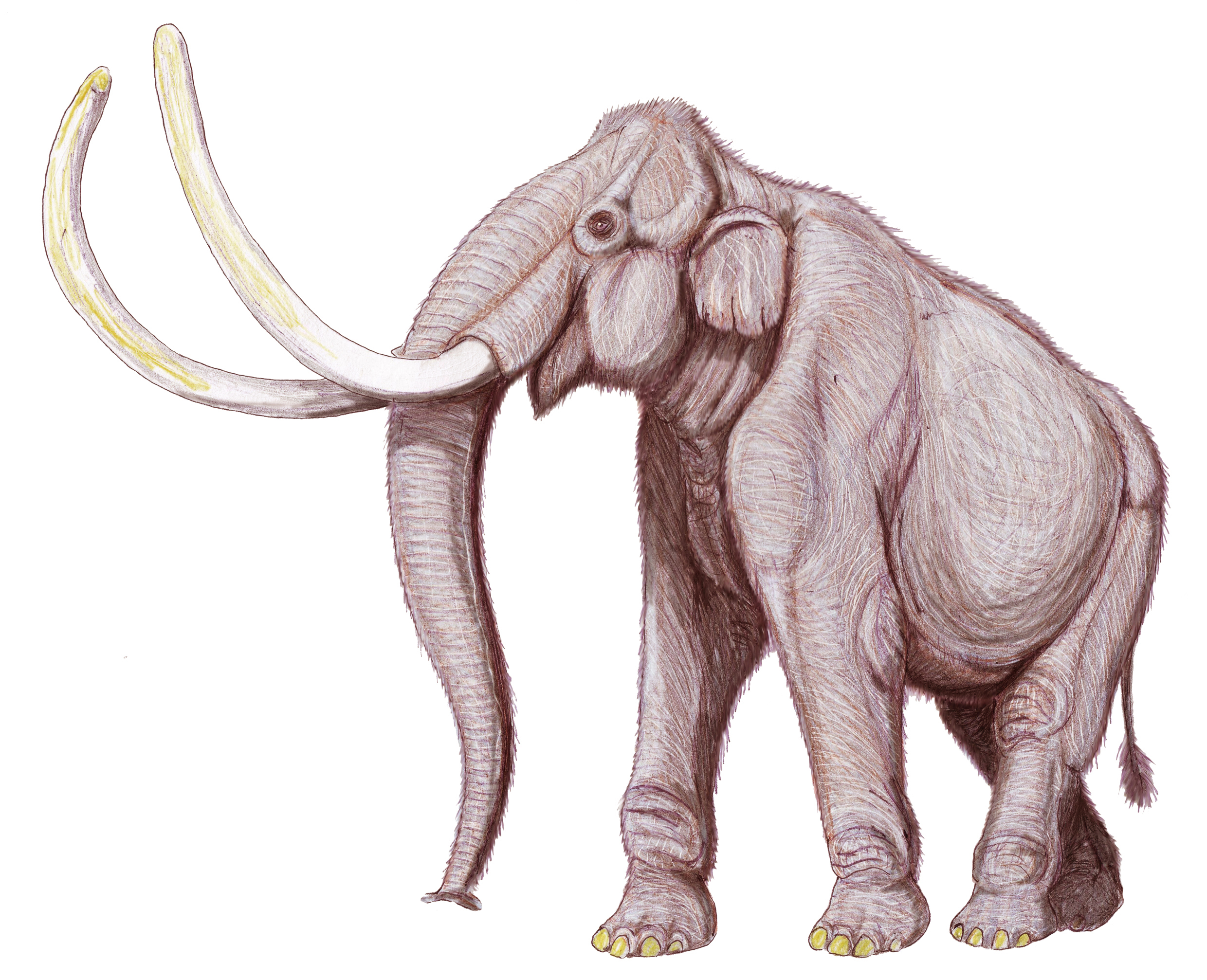
One of the largest mounted mammoth skeletons in the world, nicknamed "Archie" (left), at Nebraska State Museum of Natural History, with life restoration (right) based on same; the extent of the fur is hypothetical

Apart from its larger size and more primitive molars, the Columbian mammoth also differed from the woolly mammoth by its more downturned mandibular symphysis; the dental alveoli (tooth sockets) of the tusks were directed more laterally away from the midline. Its tail was intermediate in length between that of modern elephants and the woolly mammoth. Since no Columbian mammoth soft tissue has been found, much less is known about its appearance than that of the woolly mammoth. It lived in warmer habitats than the woolly mammoth, and probably lacked many of the adaptations seen in that species. The distribution and density of fur on the living animal is unknown, but it was probably less dense than that of the woolly mammoth due to the warmer habitat. Hair thought to be that of the Columbian mammoth has been discovered in Bechan Cave in Utah, where mammoth dung has also been found. Some of this hair is coarse, and identical to that known to belong to woolly mammoths; however, since this location is so far south, it is unlikely to be woolly mammoth hair. An additional tuft of Columbian mammoth hair is known from near Castroville in California, the hair was noted to be red-orange and was described as being similar in color to a Golden Retriever.

=== Dentition ===
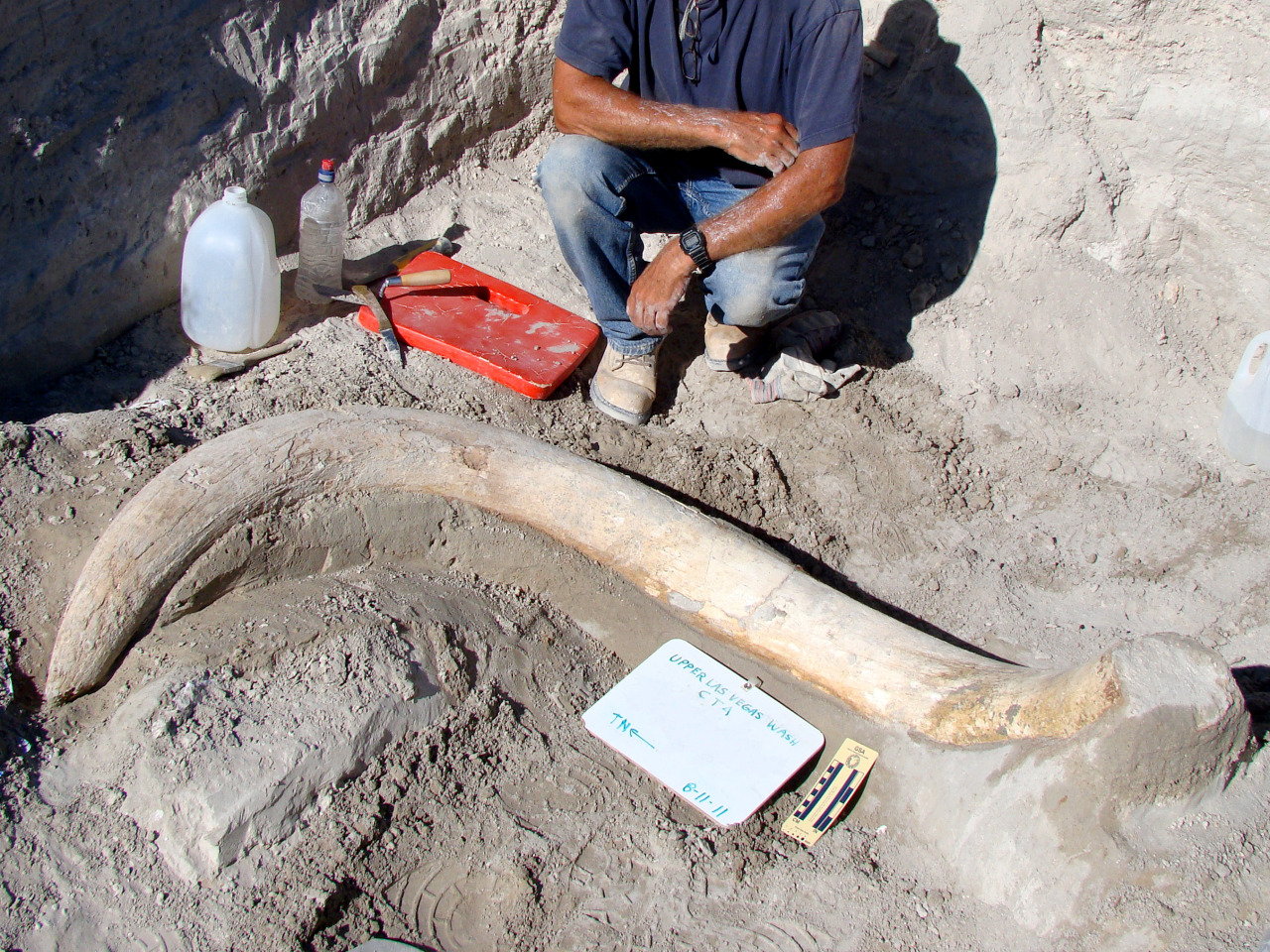
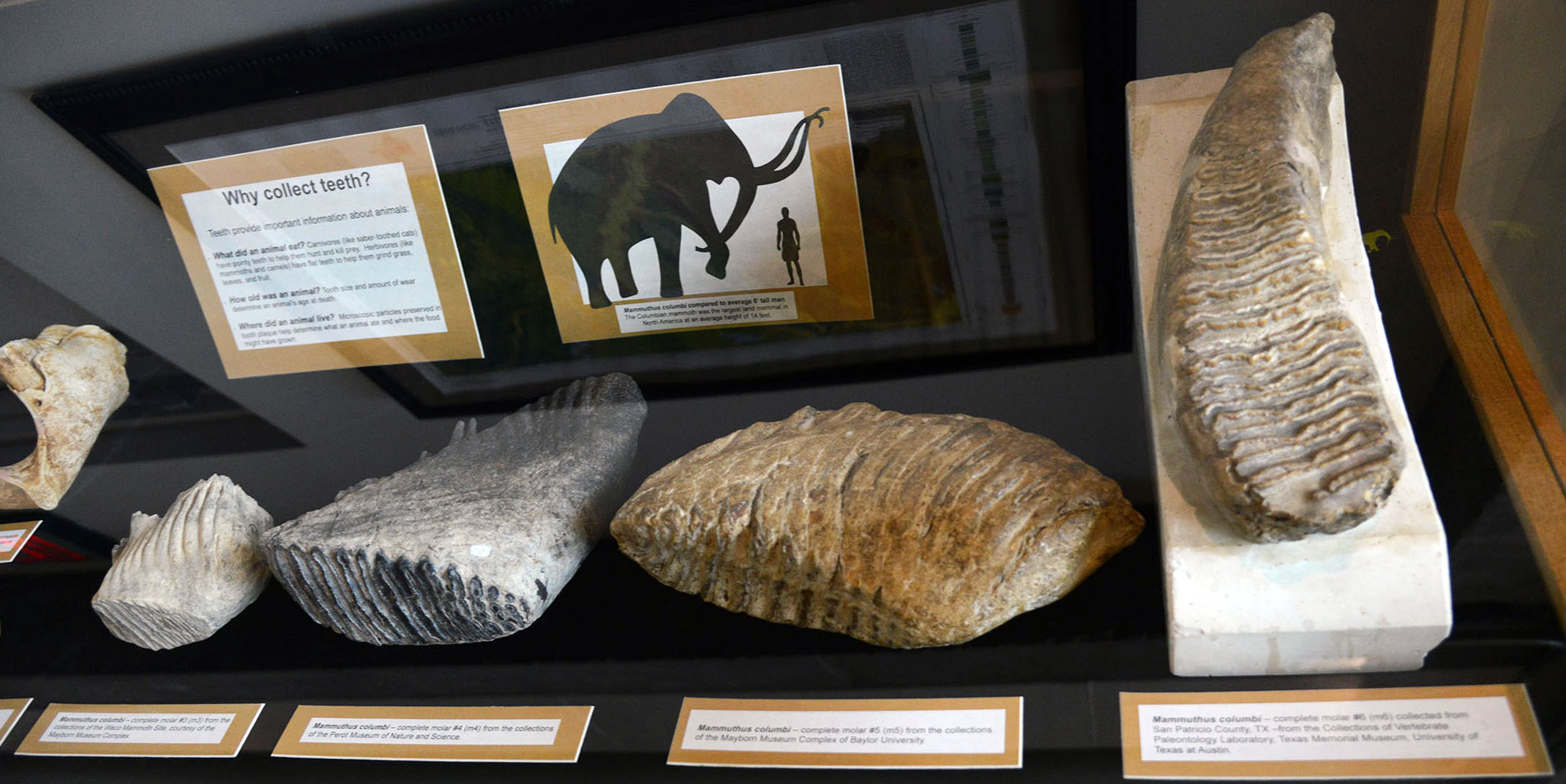
Tusk during excavation in Nevada, with human for scale (left), and complete molars (numbers m3-m6), Waco Mammoth National Monument (right)

Columbian mammoths had very long tusks (modified incisor teeth), which were more curved than those of modern elephants. Their tusks are among the largest recorded in proboscideans, with some reaching over 4 m (13 ft) in length and 200 kg (440 lb) in weight, with some historical reports of tusks up to 4.88–5.1 m (16.0–16.7 ft) long and masses of around 230–250 kg (510–550 lb). The overall length of the tusk, which was donated to the American Museum of Natural History in New York City in 1934 and has only its front end missing, is conservatively estimated to be over 4.9 m (16 ft 1 in). Columbian mammoth tusks were usually not much larger than those of woolly mammoths, which reached 4.2 m (14 ft). The tusks of females were much smaller and thinner. About a quarter of the tusks' length was inside the sockets; they grew spirally in opposite directions from the base, curving until the tips pointed towards each other, and sometimes crossed. Most of their weight would have been close to the skull, with less torque than straight tusks would have generated. The tusks were usually asymmetrical, with considerable variation; some tusks curved down, instead of outwards, or were shorter due to breakage. Columbian mammoth tusks were generally less twisted than those of woolly mammoths. At six months of age, calves developed milk tusks a few cms long, which were replaced by permanent tusks a year later. Annual tusk growth of 2.5–15 cm (0.98–5.91 in) continued throughout life, slowing as the animal reached adulthood.

Columbian mammoths had four functional molar teeth at a time, two in the upper jaw and two in the lower. A mammoth's molars were replaced five times over the animal's lifetime, with a total of six succeeding molars on each half of the jaws. About 23 cm (9.1 in) of the crown was within the jaw, and 2.5 cm (0.98 in) was above. The teeth had separated ridges (lamellae) of enamel, which were covered in "prisms" directed towards the chewing surface. Wear-resistant, they were held together with cementum and dentin. The crowns of the lower jaw were pushed forward and up as they wore down, comparable to a conveyor belt. The first molars were about the size of those of a human, 1.3 cm (0.51 in); the third ones were 15 cm (5.9 in) long, and the sixth ones were about 30 cm (12 in) long and weighed 1.8 kg (4.0 lb). With each replacement, the molars grew larger and gained more ridges; the number of plates varied between individuals. There was typically 18-21 ridges on each third molar, similar to those of M. trogontherii, but less than the 24-28 typical of woolly mammoths. Growing 18 cm (7.1 in) of ridge took about 10.6 years.

== Paleobiology ==
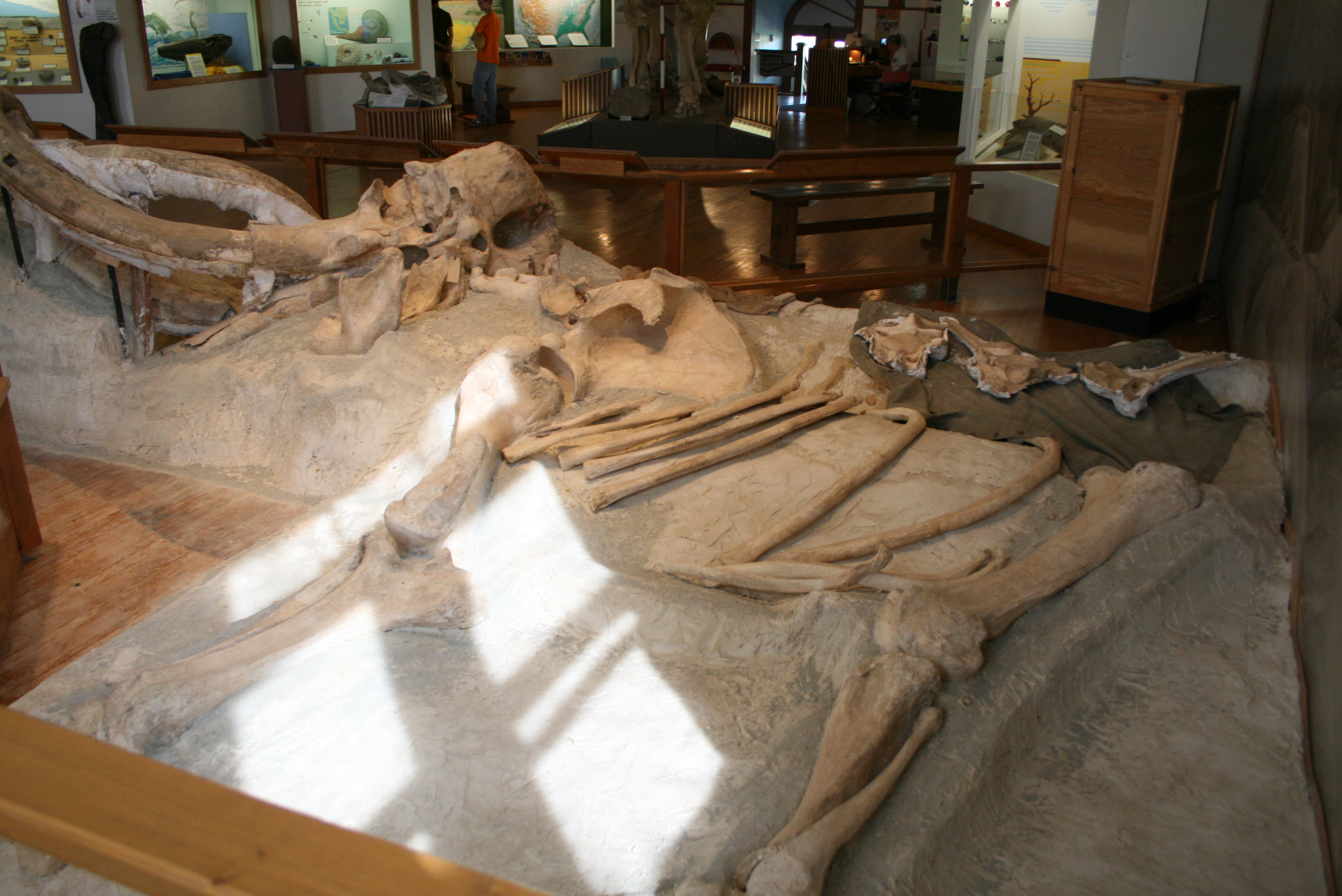
Skeletons of two males that died with their tusks interlocked, Trailside Museum of Natural History, Nebraska

Like that of modern elephants, the mammoth's sensitive, muscular trunk was a limb-like organ with many functions. It was used for manipulating objects and social interaction. Although healthy adult mammoths could defend themselves from predators with their tusks, trunks, and size, juveniles and weakened adults were vulnerable to pack hunters such as wolves and big cats. Bones of juvenile Columbian mammoths, accumulated by Homotherium (the scimitar-toothed cat), have been found in Friesenhahn Cave in Texas. Tusks may have been used in intraspecies fighting for territory or mates and for display, to attract females and intimidate rivals. Two Columbian mammoths that died in Nebraska with tusks interlocked provide evidence of fighting behavior. The mammoths could use their tusks as weapons by thrusting, swiping, or crashing them down, and used them in pushing contests by interlocking them, which sometimes resulted in breakage. The tusks' curvature made them unsuitable for stabbing.

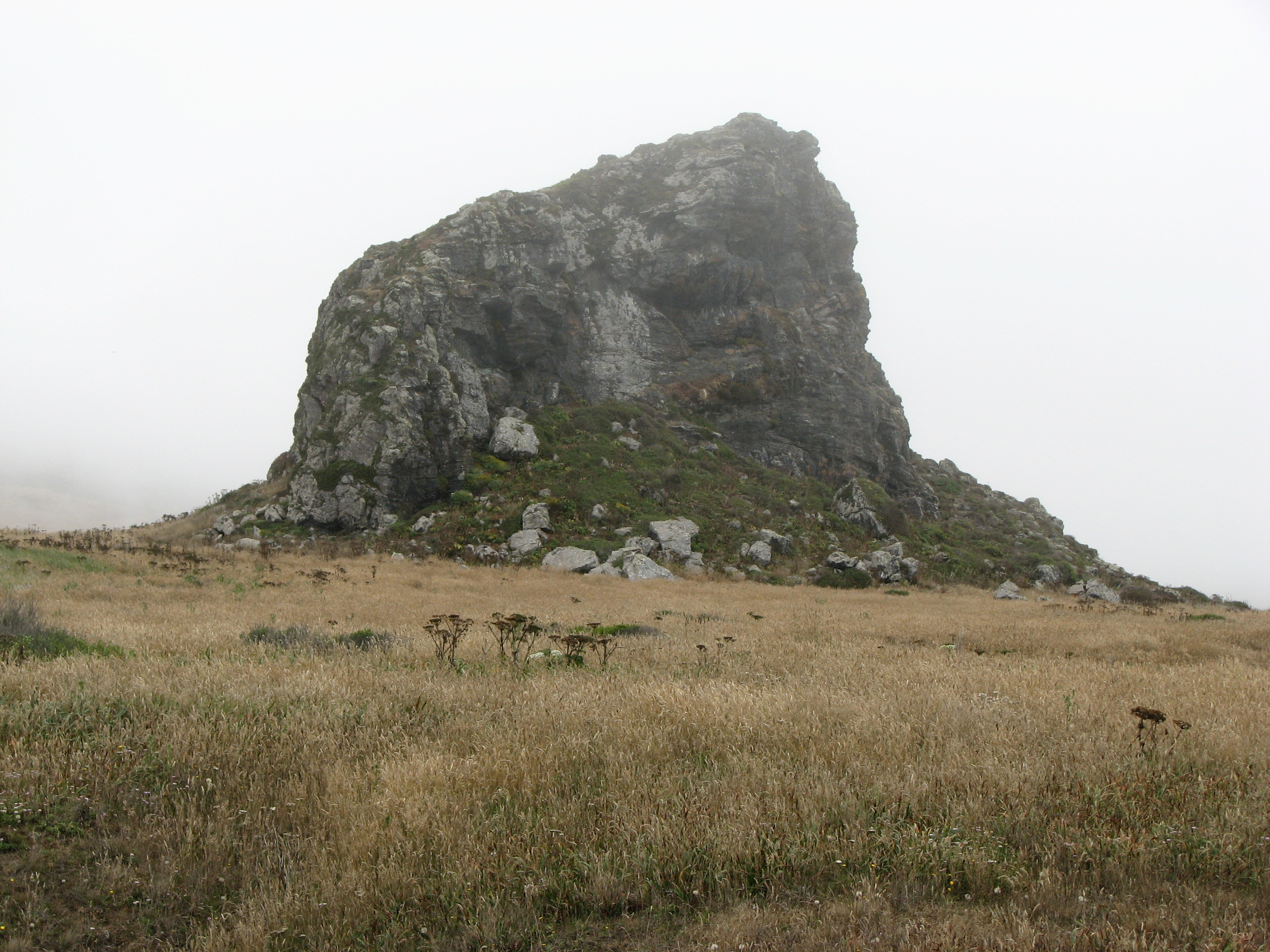
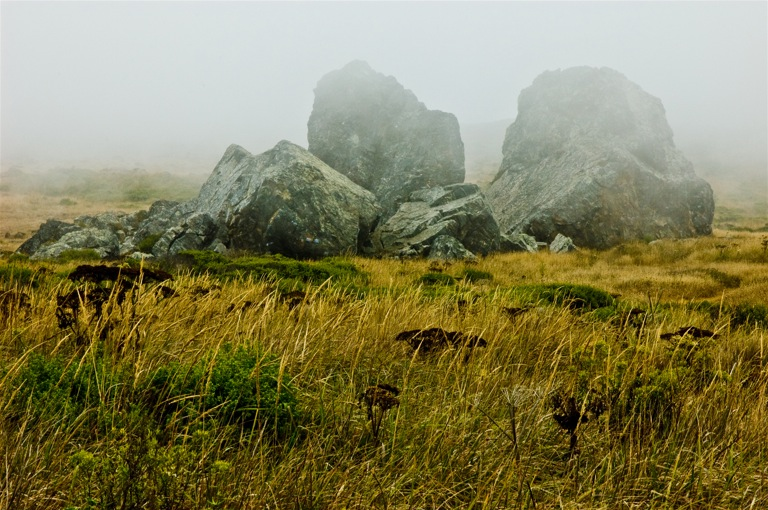
Outcrops on Goat Rock Beach, possibly used as rubbing rocks by Columbian mammoths or mastodons

On Goat Rock Beach in Sonoma Coast State Park, blueschist and chert outcrops (nicknamed "Mammoth Rocks") show evidence of having been rubbed by Columbian mammoths or mastodons. The rocks have polished areas 3–4 m (9.8–13.1 ft) above the ground, primarily near their edges, and are similar to African rubbing rocks used by elephants and other herbivores to rid themselves of mud and parasites. Similar rocks exist in Hueco Tanks, Texas, and on Cornudas Mountain in New Mexico.

=== Social behavior and migration ===
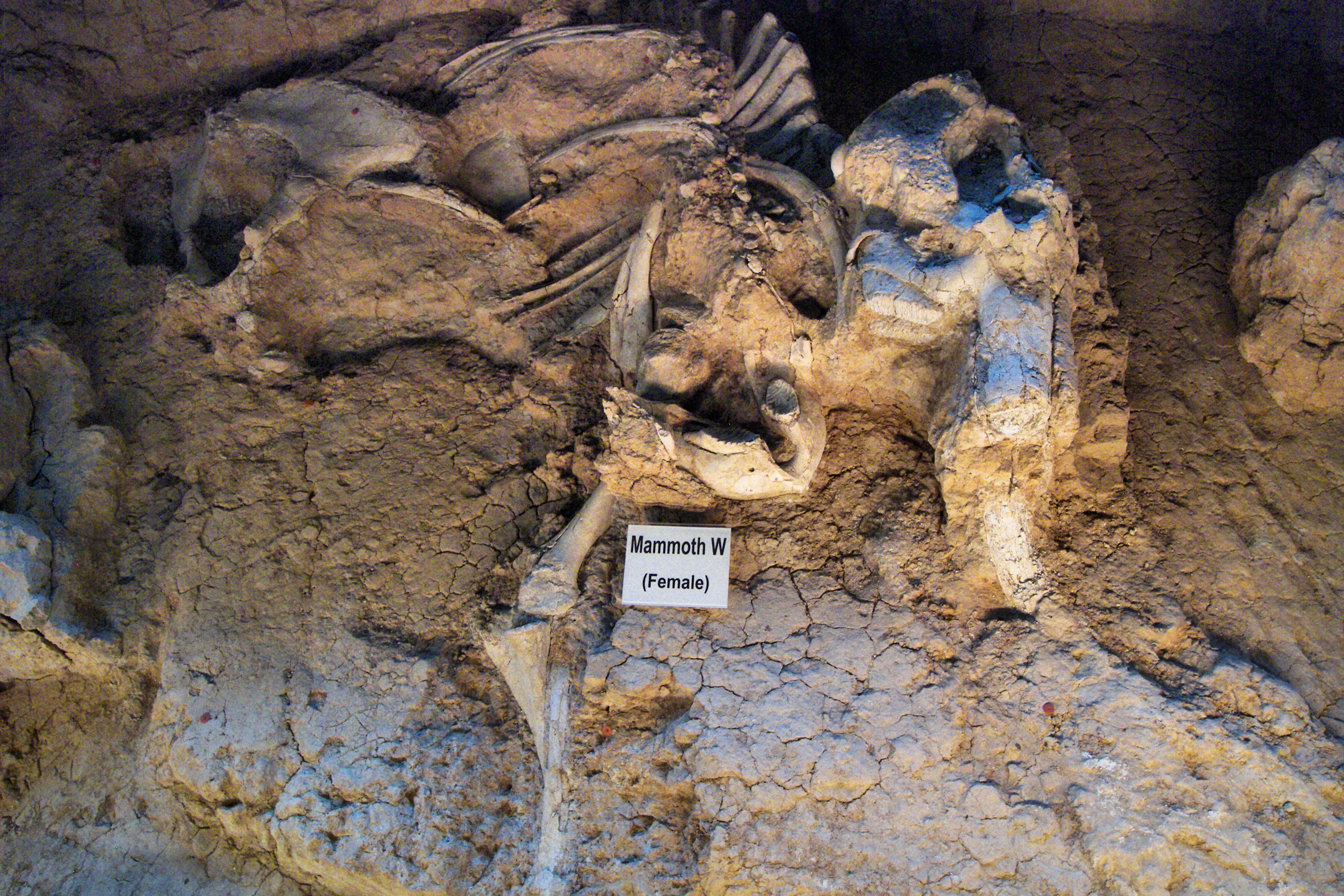
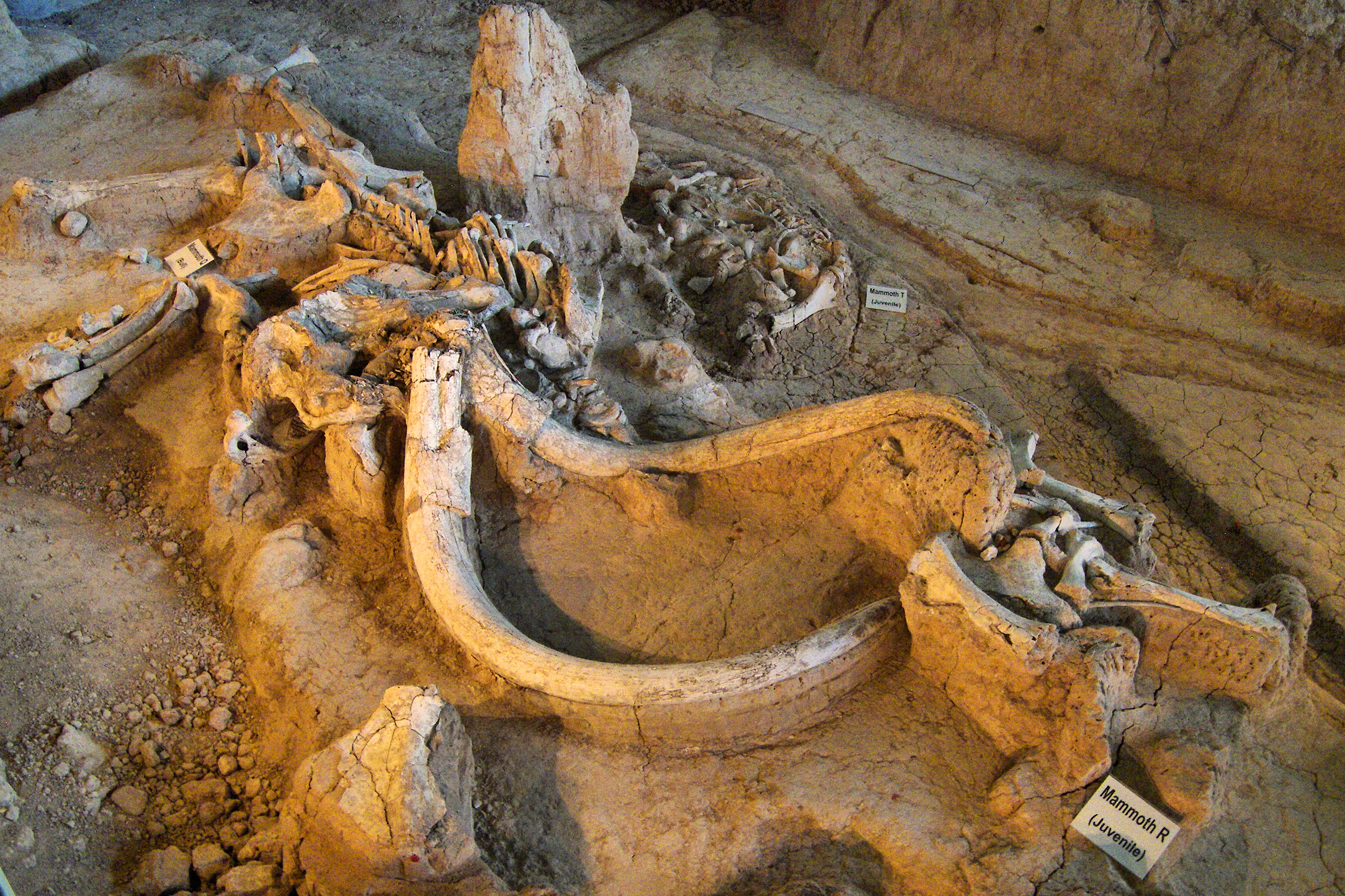
Female "mammoth W" (left) and male "Q", with juveniles "R" and "T" (right), at the Waco Mammoth National Monument

Like modern elephants, Columbian mammoths were probably social and lived in matriarchal (female-led) family groups; most of their other social behavior was also similar to that of modern elephants. This is supported by fossil assemblages such as the Dent site in Colorado and the Waco Mammoth National Monument in Waco, Texas, where groups consisting entirely of female and juvenile Columbian mammoths have been found (implying female-led family groups). The latter assemblage includes 22 skeletons, with 15 individuals representing a herd of females and juveniles that died in a single event. The herd was originally proposed to have been killed by a flash flood, and the arrangement of some of the skeletons suggests that the females may have formed a defensive ring around the juveniles. In 2016, the herd was suggested to have died by drought near a diminishing watering hole; scavenging traces on the bones contradict rapid burial, and the absence of calves and the large diversity of other animal species found gathered at the site support this scenario. Another group, consisting of a bull and six females, was found at the same site; although both groups died between 64,000 and 73,000 years ago, whether they died in the same event is unknown. At the Murray Springs Clovis Site in Arizona, where several Columbian mammoth skeletons have been excavated, a fossil trackway similar to that left by modern elephants leads to one of the skeletons. The mammoth may have made the trackway before it died, or another individual may have approached the dead or dying animal—similar to the way modern elephants guard dead relatives for several days. A herd trackway including six mammoths from Fossil Lake, Oregon indicates that a limping individual was attended by concerned juveniles.

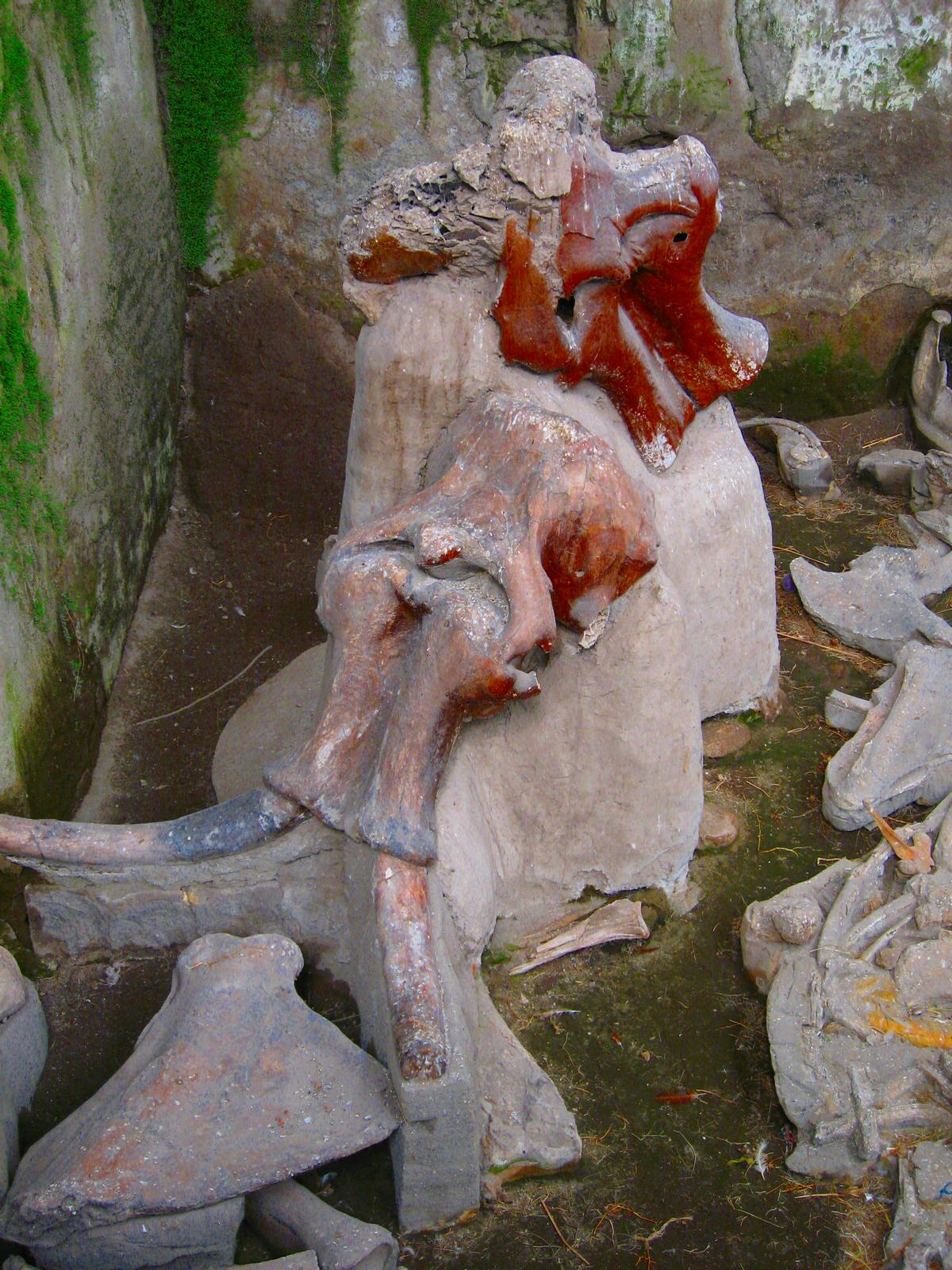
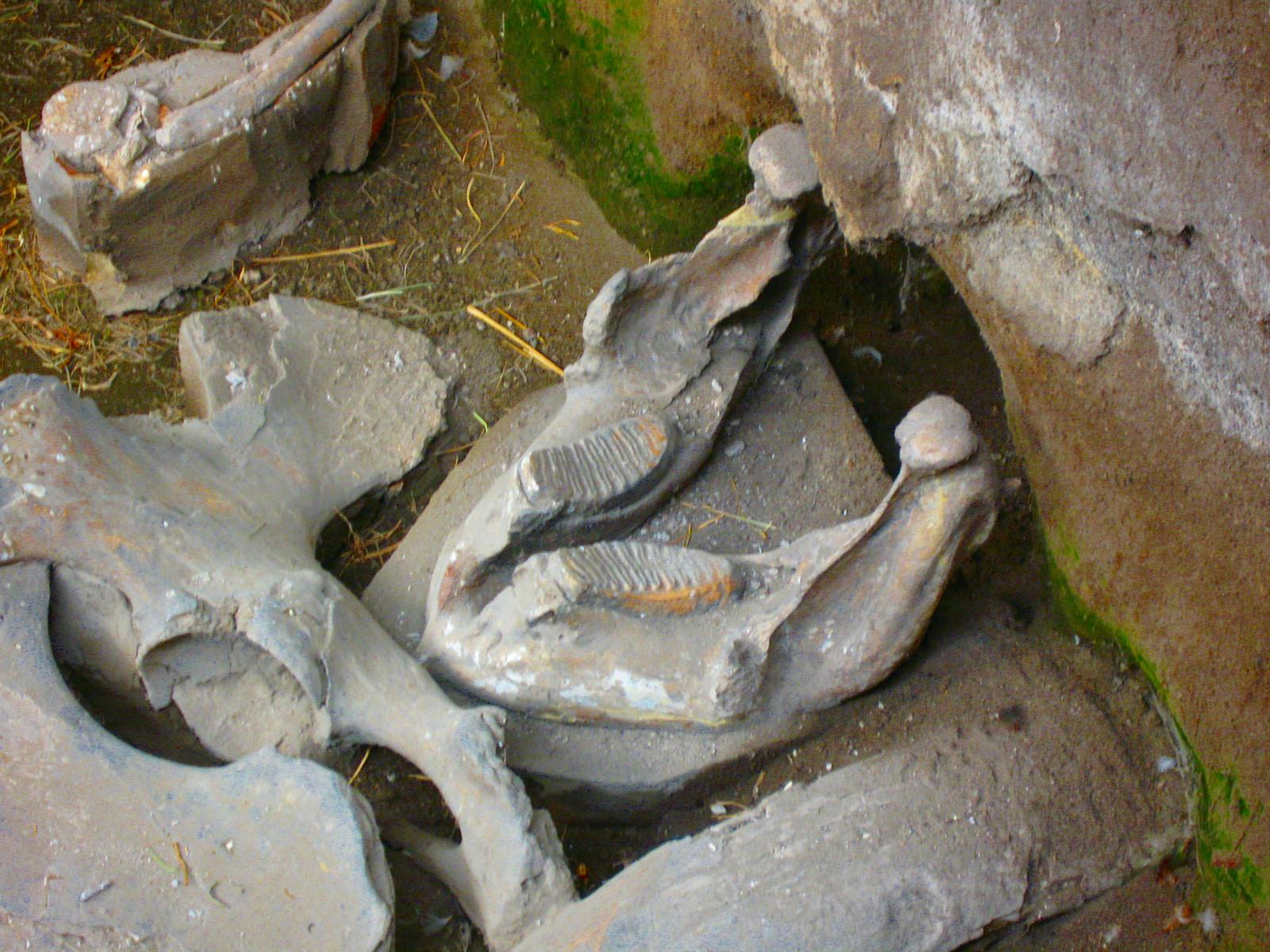
Skulls (left) and mandible (right) in a lahar deposit at the Paleontological Museum in Tocuila

Accumulations of modern elephant remains have been called "elephants' graveyards", because these sites were erroneously thought to be where old elephants went to die. Similar accumulations of mammoth bones have been found; these are thought to be the result of individuals dying near or in rivers over thousands of years and their bones being accumulated by the water (such as in the Aucilla River in Florida), or animals dying after becoming mired in mud. Some accumulations are thought to be the remains of herds that died at the same time, perhaps due to flooding. Columbian mammoths are occasionally preserved in volcanic deposits such as those in Tocuila, Texcoco, Mexico, where a volcanic lahar mudflow covered at least seven individuals 12,500 years ago. How many mammoths lived at one location at a time is unknown, but the number likely varied by season and lifecycle. Modern elephants can form large herds, sometimes consisting of multiple family groups, and these herds can include thousands of animals migrating together. Mammoths may have formed large herds more often than modern elephants, since animals living in open areas are more likely to do this than those in forested areas.

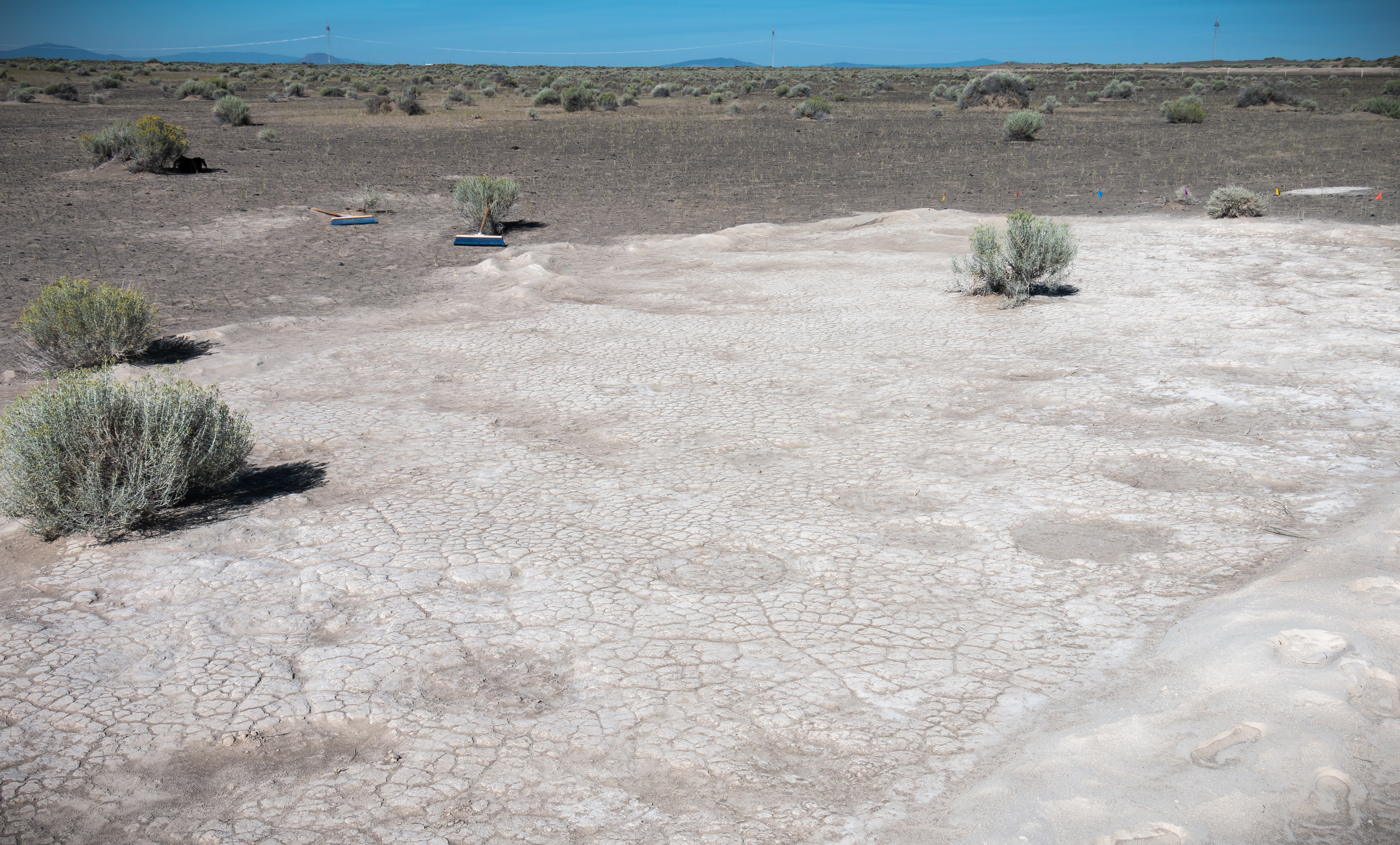
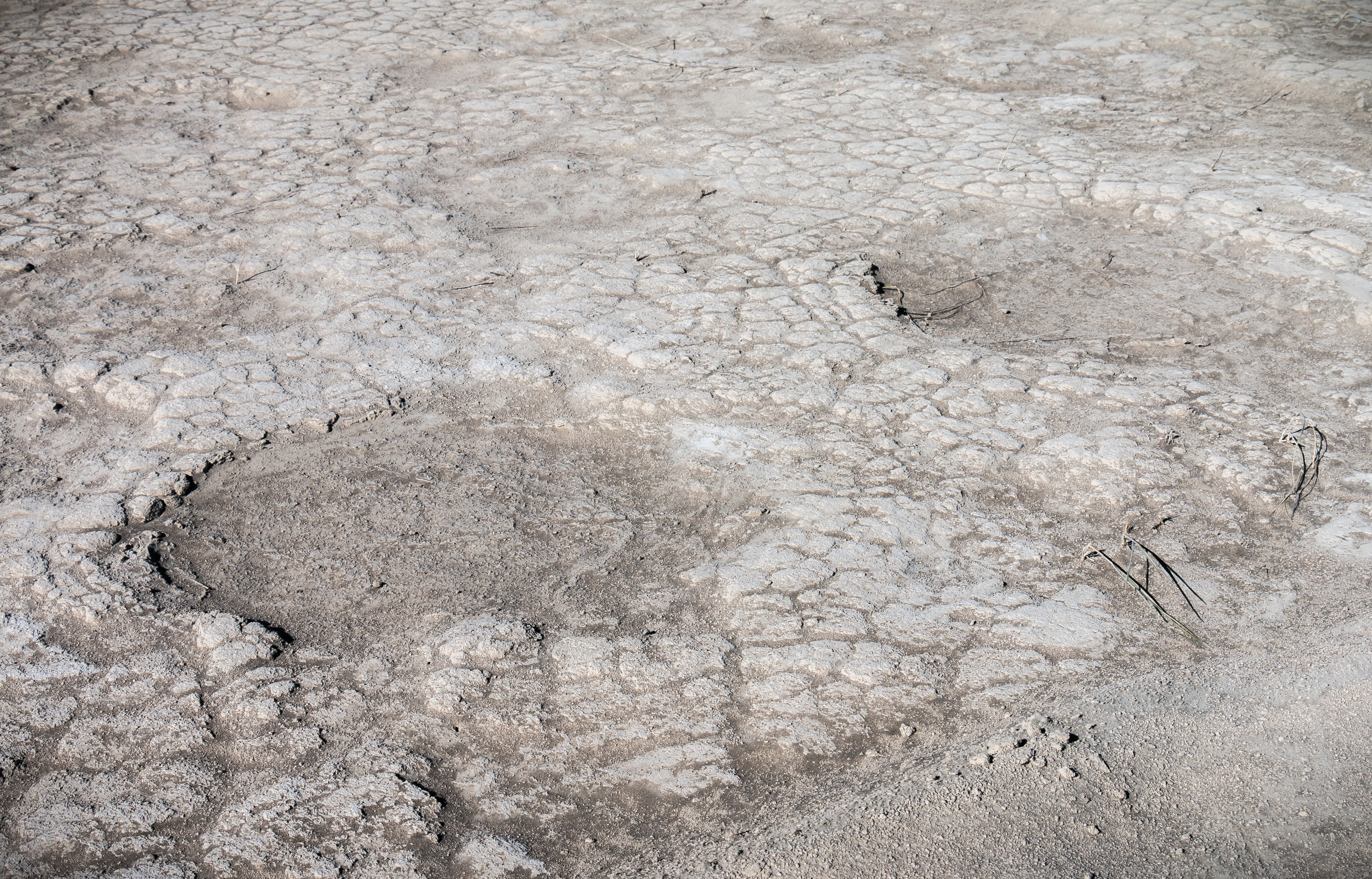
Fossil trackway of a herd in Fossil Lake, Oregon

Although to what extent Columbian mammoths migrated is unclear, an isotope analysis of Blackwater Draw in New Mexico indicated that they spent part of the year in the Rocky Mountains, 200 km (120 mi) away. The study of tusk rings may aid further study of mammoth migration. Mathematical modelling indicates that Columbian mammoths would have had to have been periodically on the move to avoid starvation, as prolonged stays in one area would rapidly exhaust the food resources necessary to sustain a population. Analysis of ^{87}Sr/^{86}Sr from Columbian mammoth enamel from the Colby Site in Wyoming suggest relatively slow annual movement patterns, however, totalling less than 250 km per year.

=== Natural traps ===
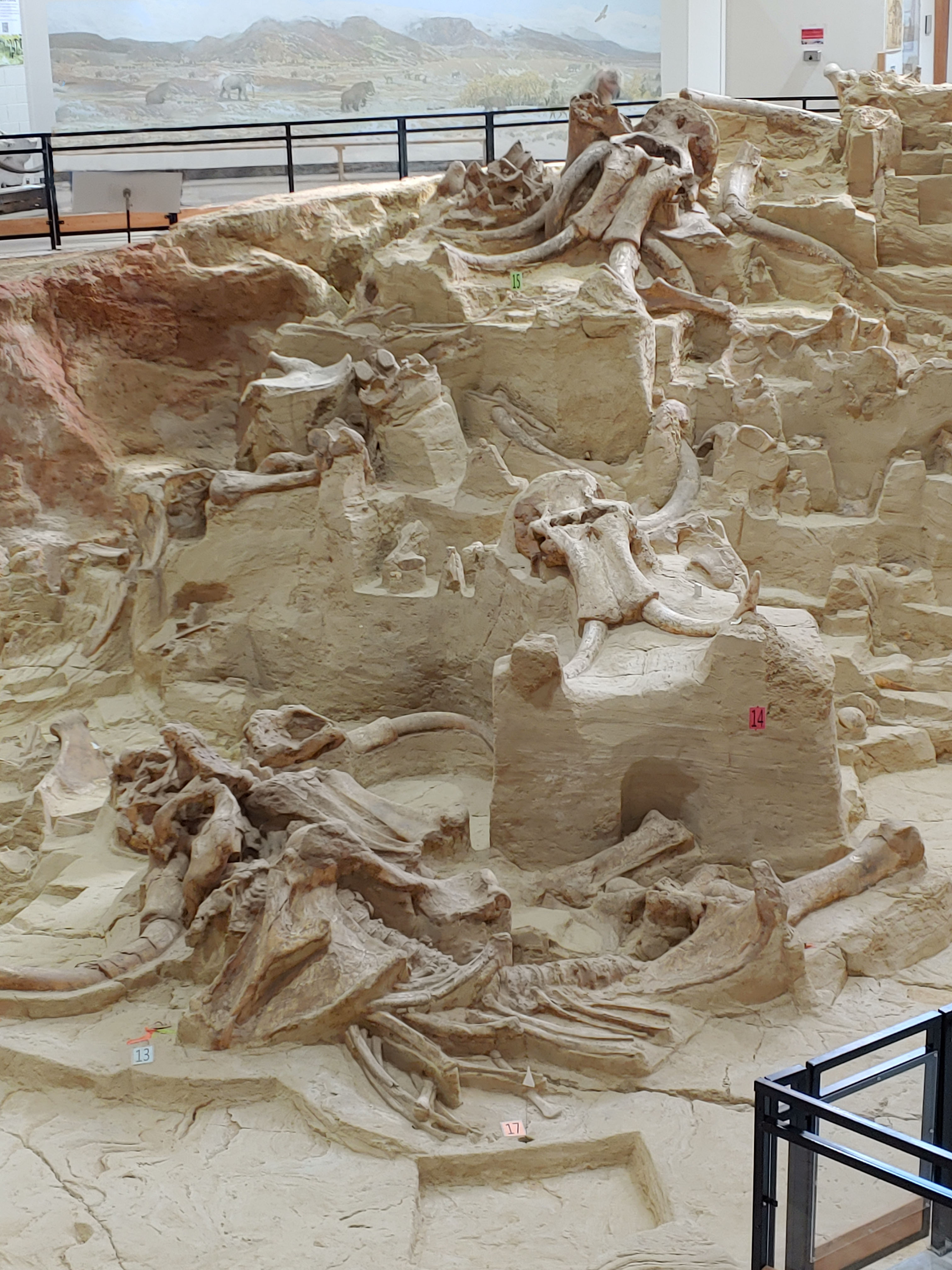
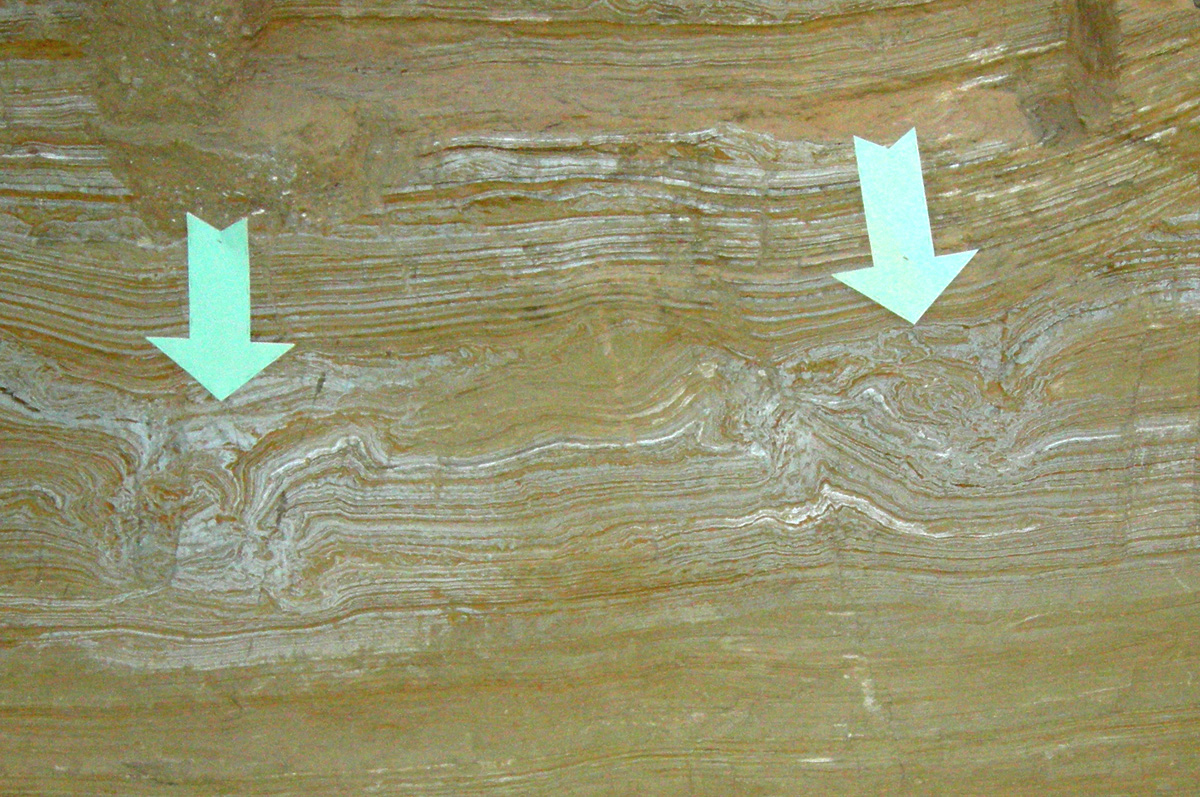
Various skeletons (left) and footprints of a struggling mammoth (arrows), at the Hot Springs Mammoth Site

Many specimens also accumulated in natural traps, such as sinkholes and tar pits. The Mammoth Site in Hot Springs, South Dakota, is a 232-160,000-year-old, roughly 40 m (130 ft)-long sinkhole. The site is the opposite scenario of that in Waco; all but one of the at least 55 skeletons—additional skeletons are excavated each year—are male, and accumulated over time rather than in a single event. Like modern male elephants, male mammoths primarily are assumed to have lived alone, to be more adventurous (especially young males), and to be more likely to encounter dangerous situations than the females. The mammoths may have been lured to the hole by warm water or vegetation near the edges, slipping in and drowning or starving. Isotope studies of growth rings have shown that most of the mammoths died during spring and summer, which may have correlated with vegetation near the sinkhole. One individual, nicknamed "Murray", lies on its side, and probably died in this pose while struggling to get free. Deep footprints of mammoths attempting to free themselves from the sinkhole's mud can be seen in vertically excavated sections of the site.

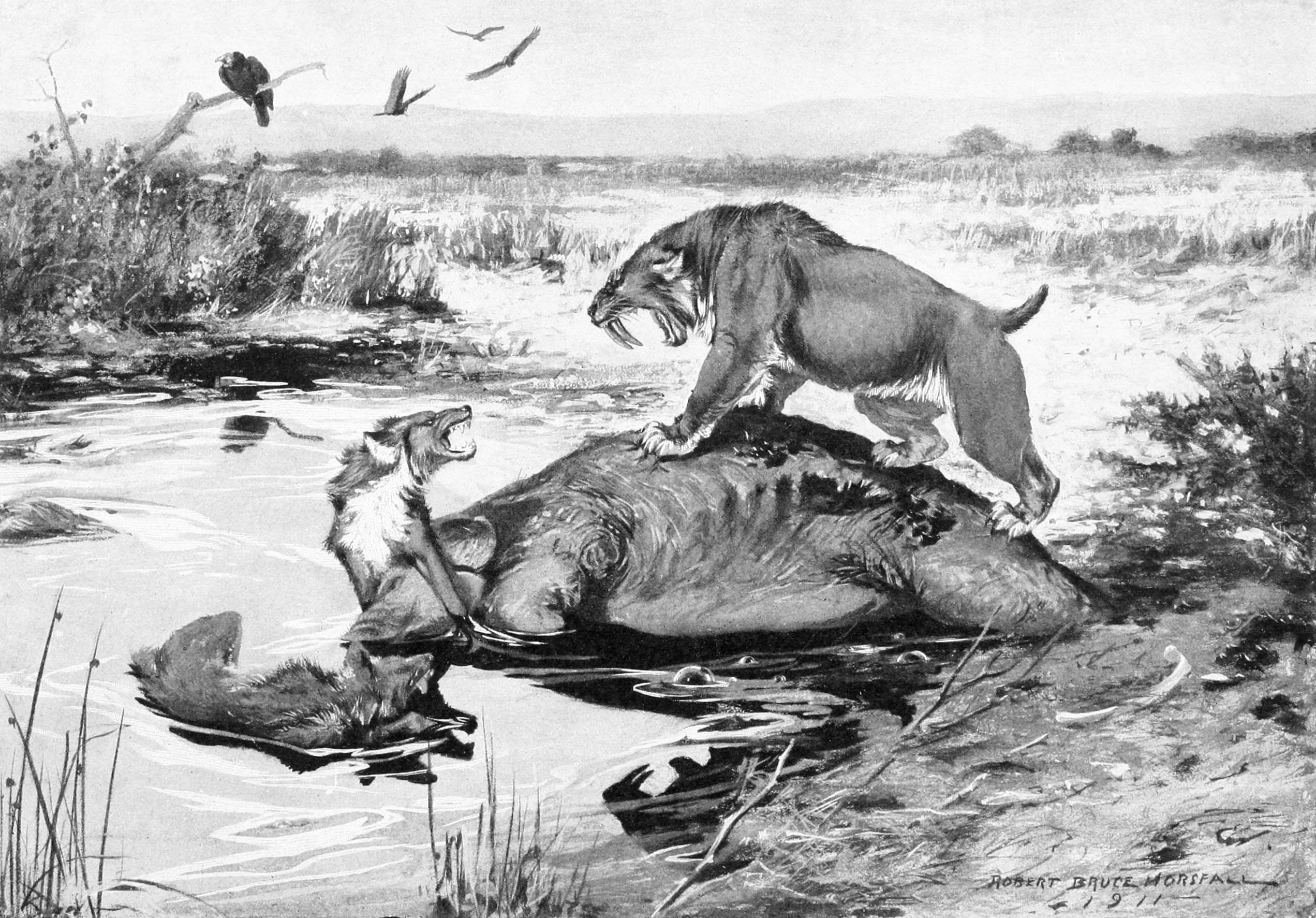
Smilodon and dire wolves fighting over a Columbian mammoth carcass in the La Brea Tar Pits, by Robert Bruce Horsfall, 1911

Since the early 20th century, excavations at the La Brea Tar Pits in Los Angeles have yielded 100 t (220,000 lb) of fossils from 600 species of flora and fauna, including several Columbian mammoths. Many of the fossils are the remains of animals that became stuck in asphalt puddles that seeped to the surface of the pits, 40,000 to 11,500 years ago. Dust and leaves likely concealed the liquid asphalt, which then trapped unwary animals. Mired animals died from hunger or exhaustion; their corpses attracted predators, which sometimes became stuck, themselves. The fossil record of the tar pits is dominated by the remains of predators, such as large canids and felids. Fossils of different animals are found stuck together when they are excavated from the pits. The tar pits do not preserve soft tissue, and a 2014 study concluded that asphalt may degrade the DNA of animals mired in it after an attempt was made to extract DNA from a Columbian mammoth.

A site in an airport construction area in Mexico nicknamed "mammoth central" is believed to have been the boggy shores of an ancient lake bed where animals were trapped 10,000 to 20,000 years ago. Human tools have been found at the site. It remains unclear whether the 200 Columbian mammoths found there died of natural causes and were then carved by humans. Some have hypothesized that humans drove the Columbian mammoths into the area to kill them. The site is only 12 miles (19 km) from artificial pits which were once used by humans to trap and kill large mammals.

=== Diet ===
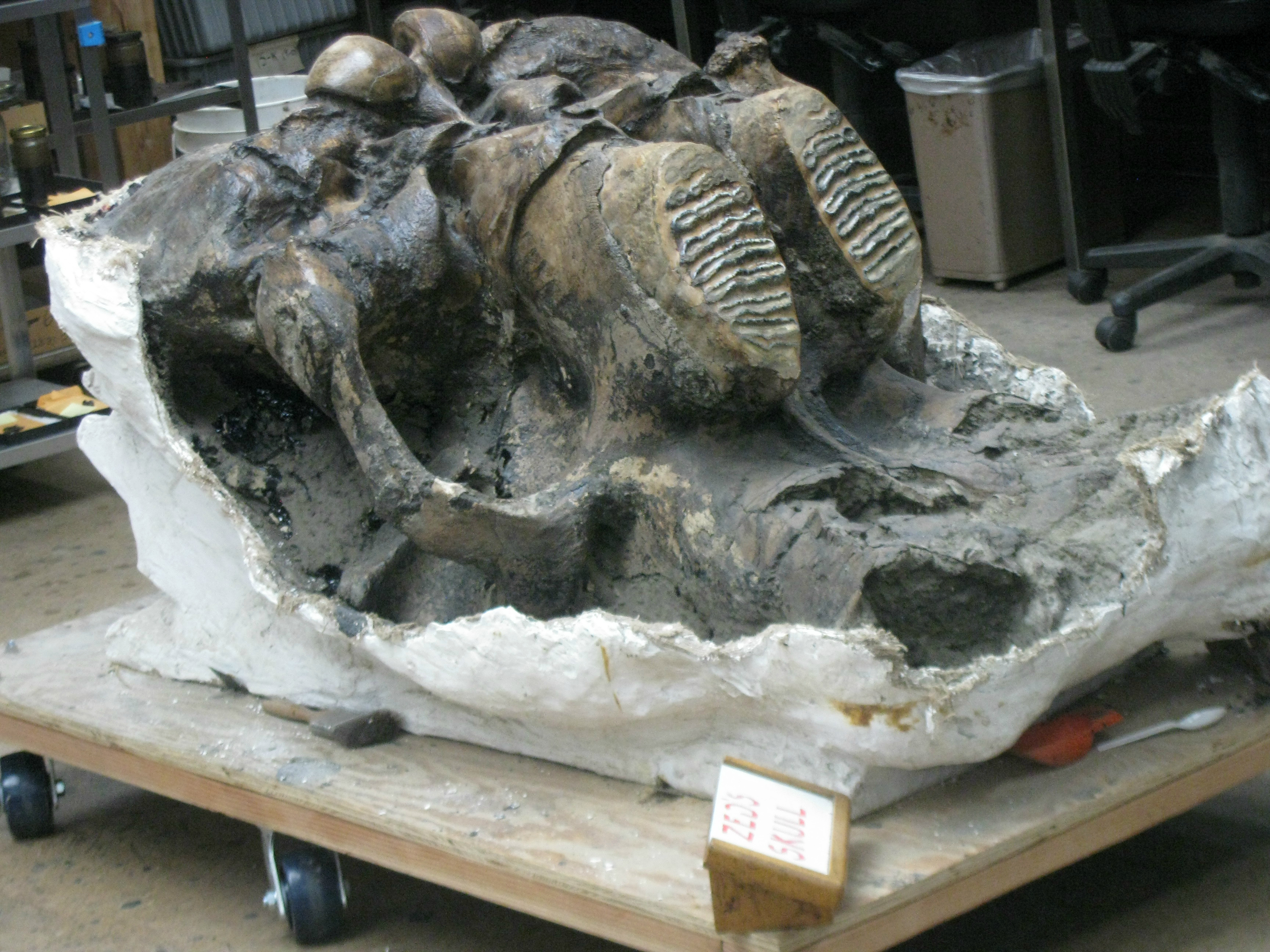
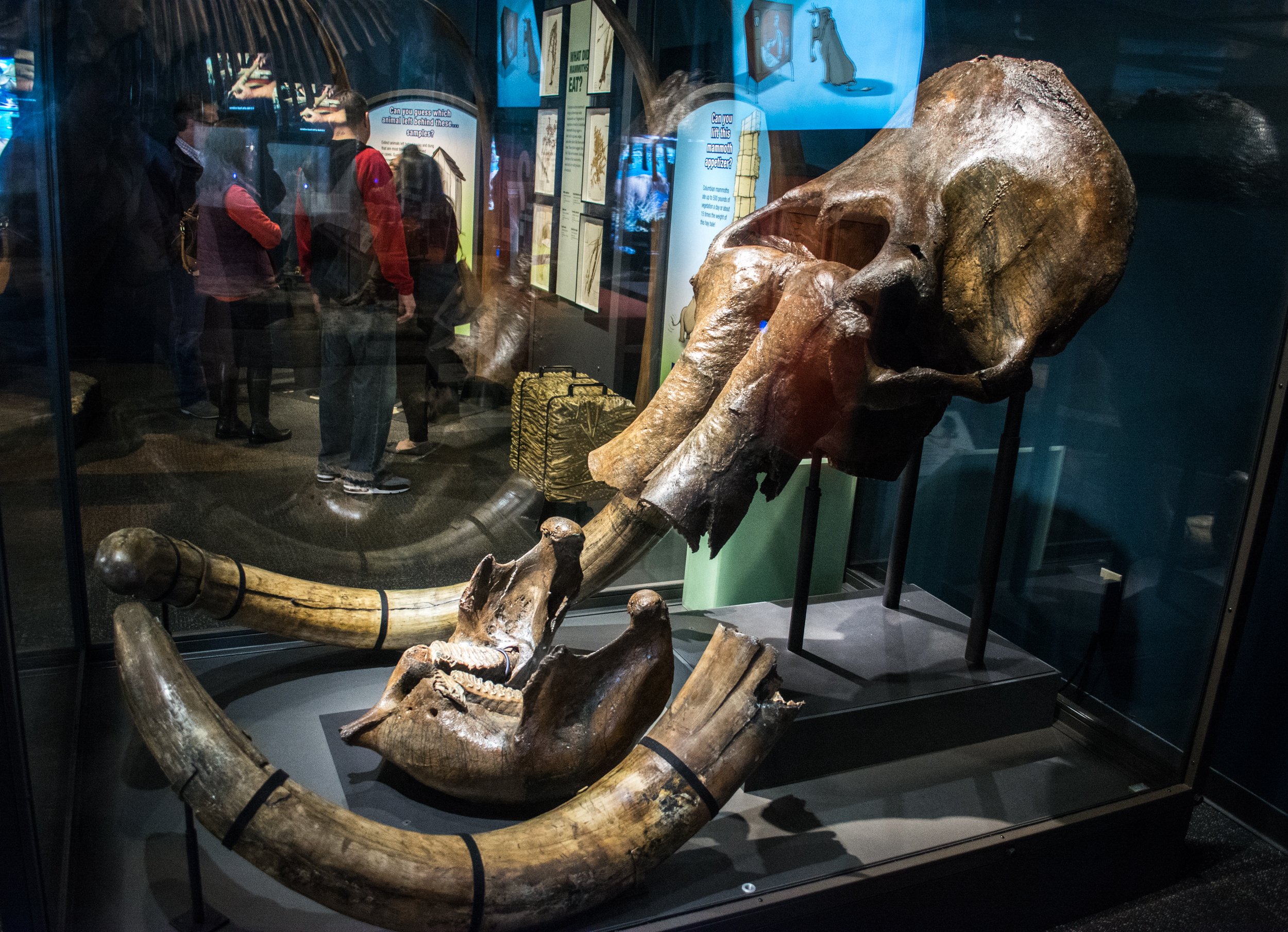
Underside of the skull of the male La Brea specimen "Zed", showing upper molars (left), and skull, mandible, and teeth of the male "Rawlins mammoth", University of Wyoming Geological Museum (right)

An adult Columbian mammoth would have needed more than 180 kg (400 lb) of food per day, and may have foraged for 20 hours a day. Mammoths chewed their food using their powerful jaw muscles to move the mandible forward and close the mouth, then backward while opening; the sharp enamel ridges thereby cut across each other, grinding the food. The ridges were wear-resistant, enabling the animal to chew large quantities of food that contained grit. The trunk could be used for pulling up large tufts of grass, picking buds and flowers, or tearing leaves and branches from trees and shrubs, and the tusks were used to dig up plants and strip bark from trees. Digging is indicated on preserved tusks by flat, polished sections of the surface that would have reached the ground.

Isotope studies of Columbian mammoths from Mexico and the United States have shown that their diet varied by location, consisting of a mix of C_{3} (most plants) and C_{4} plants (such as grasses), and they were not restricted to grazing or browsing. Dental mesowear and microwear indicate most Columbian mammoths were generalist mixed feeders, though with mostly browsing diets also being recorded in some individuals. Even individual Columbian mammoths from the same geographic location show major differences in dental wear patterns, indicating extensive variation in dietary habits between different individuals within the same population. Evidence from Florida reveals that Columbian mammoths typically preferred C_{4} grasses, but that they would alter their dietary habits and consume greater proportions of non-traditional foods during periods of significant environmental change. Columbian mammoth diets also varied seasonally, with their reliance on C_{4} plants increasing during warm periods. The magnitude of their seasonal dietary variability was greater in more northerly environments relative to ones closer to the tropics.

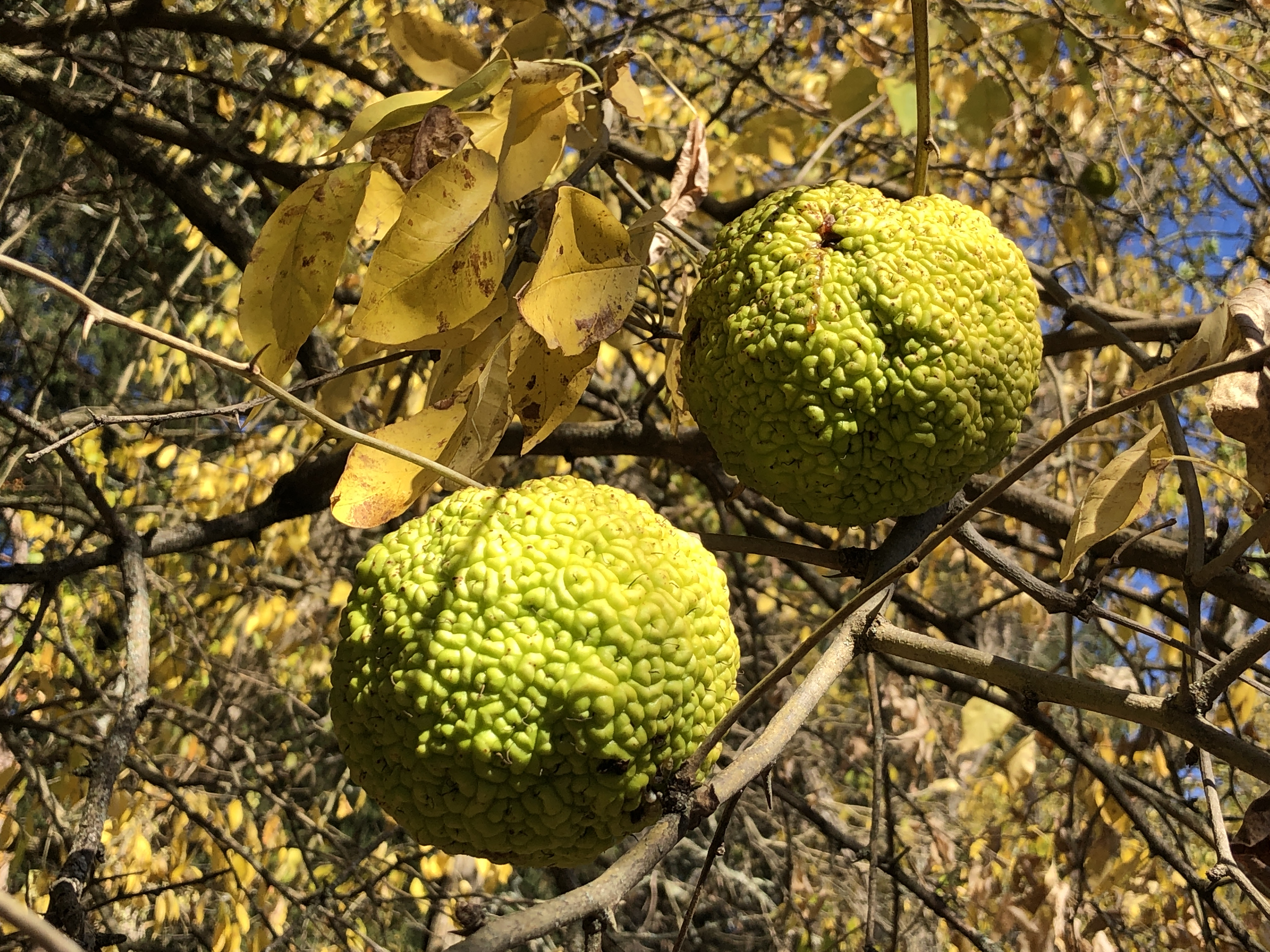
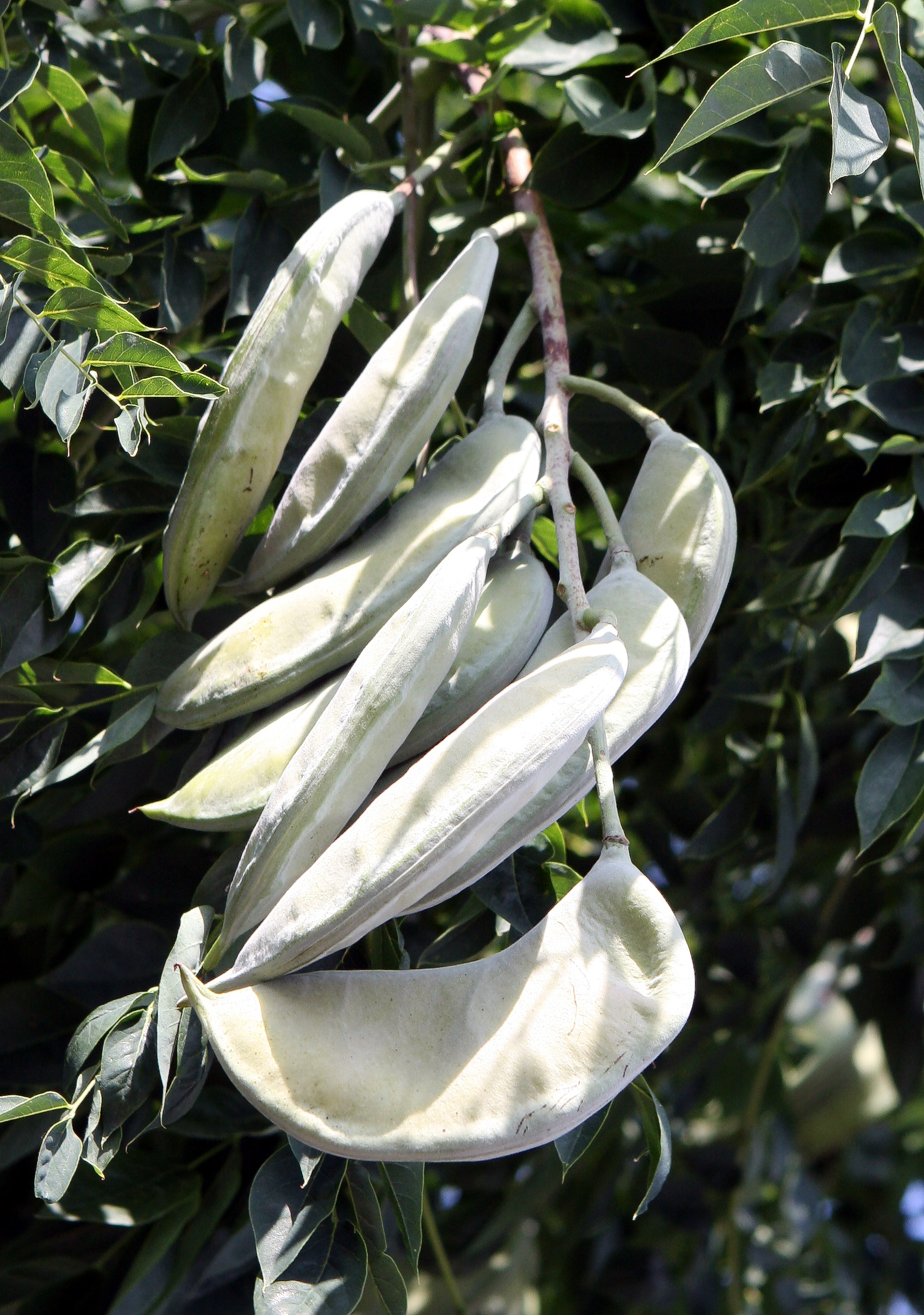
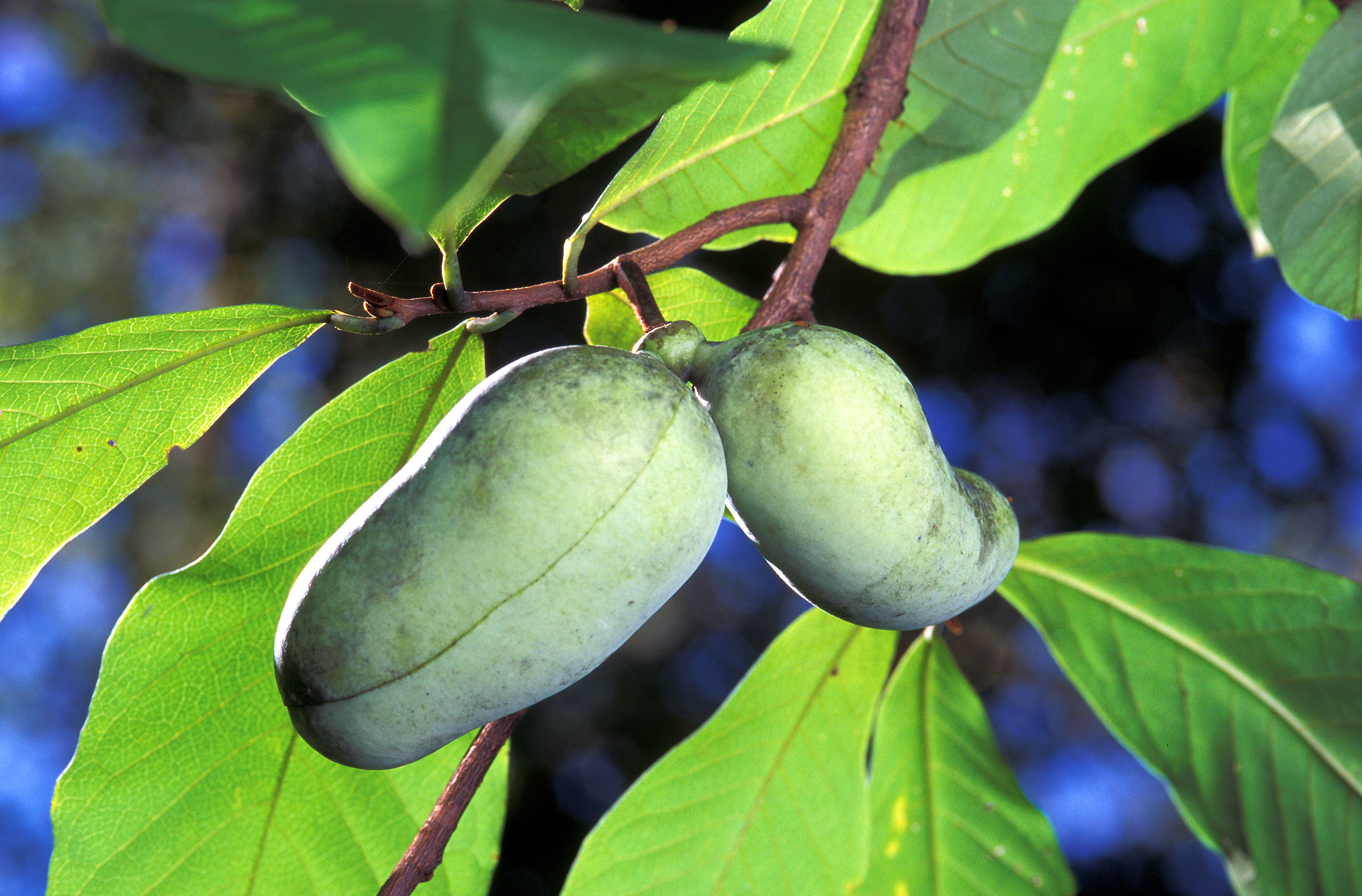
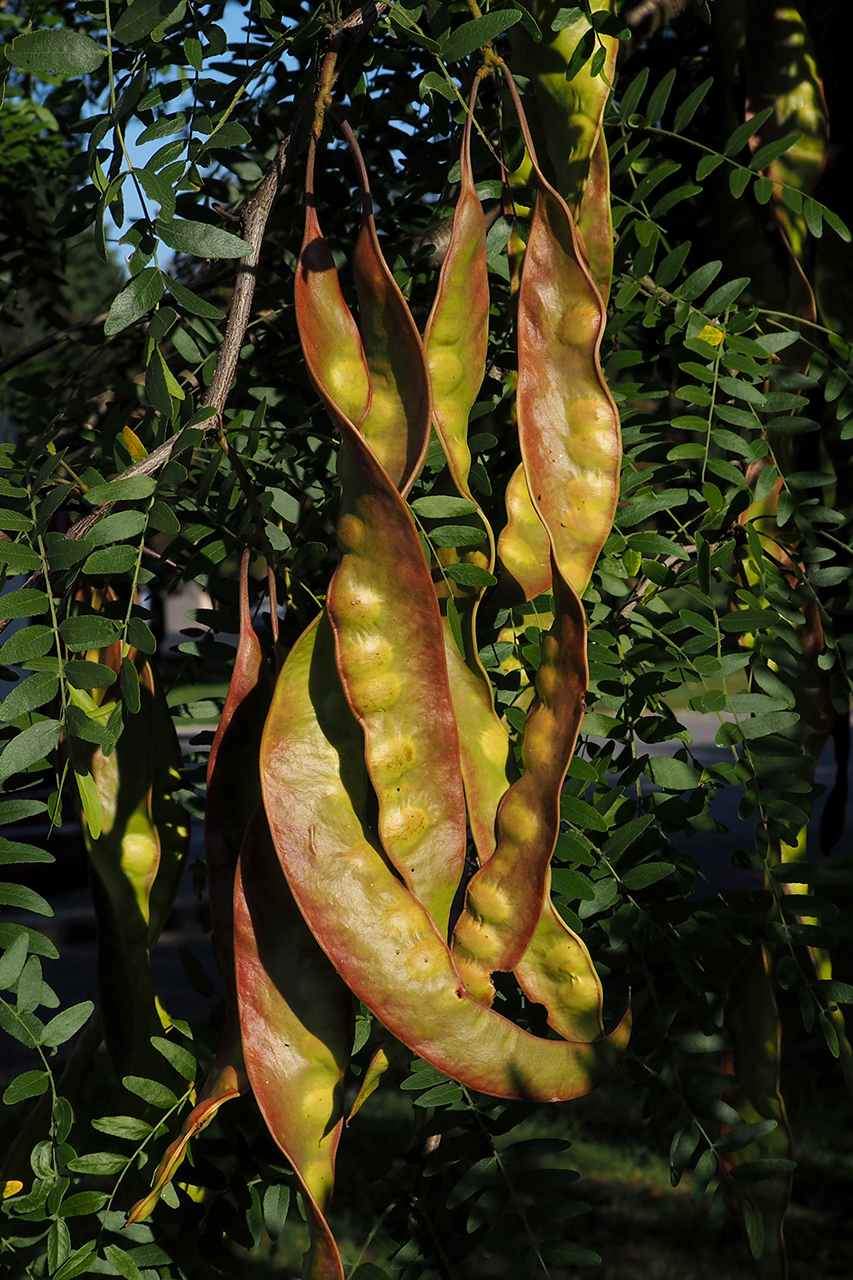
Large North American fruits that may have evolved in tandem with megafauna such as Columbian mammoths

Stomach contents from Columbian mammoths are rare, since no carcasses have been found, but plant remains were discovered between the pelvis and ribs of the "Huntington mammoth" when it was excavated in Utah. Microscopy showed that these chewed remains consisted of sedges, grasses, fir twigs and needles, oak, and maple. A large amount of mammoth dung has been found in two caves in Utah. The dry conditions and stable temperature of Bechan Cave (bechan is Navajo for "large faeces") has preserved 16,000- to 13,500-year-old elephant dung, most likely from Columbian mammoths. The dung consists of 95% grasses and sedges, and varies from 0 to 25% woody plants between dung boluses, including saltbush, sagebrush, water birch, and blue spruce. This is similar to the diet documented for the woolly mammoth, although browsing seems to have been more important for the Columbian mammoth. The cover of dung is 41 cm (16 in) thick, and has a volume of 227 m^{3} (8,000 cu ft), with the largest boluses 20 cm (7.9 in) in diameter. The Bechan dung could have been produced by a small group of mammoths over a relatively short time, since adult African elephants drop an average of 11 kg (24 lb) of dung every two hours and 90–135 kg (198–298 lb) each day.

Large North American fruits of plants such as the Osage-orange, Kentucky coffeetree, pawpaw and honey locust have been proposed to have evolved in tandem with now-extinct American megafauna such as Columbian mammoths and other proboscideans, since no extant endemic herbivores are able to ingest these fruits and disperse their seeds. Introduced cattle and horses have since taken over this ecological role.

=== Life history ===
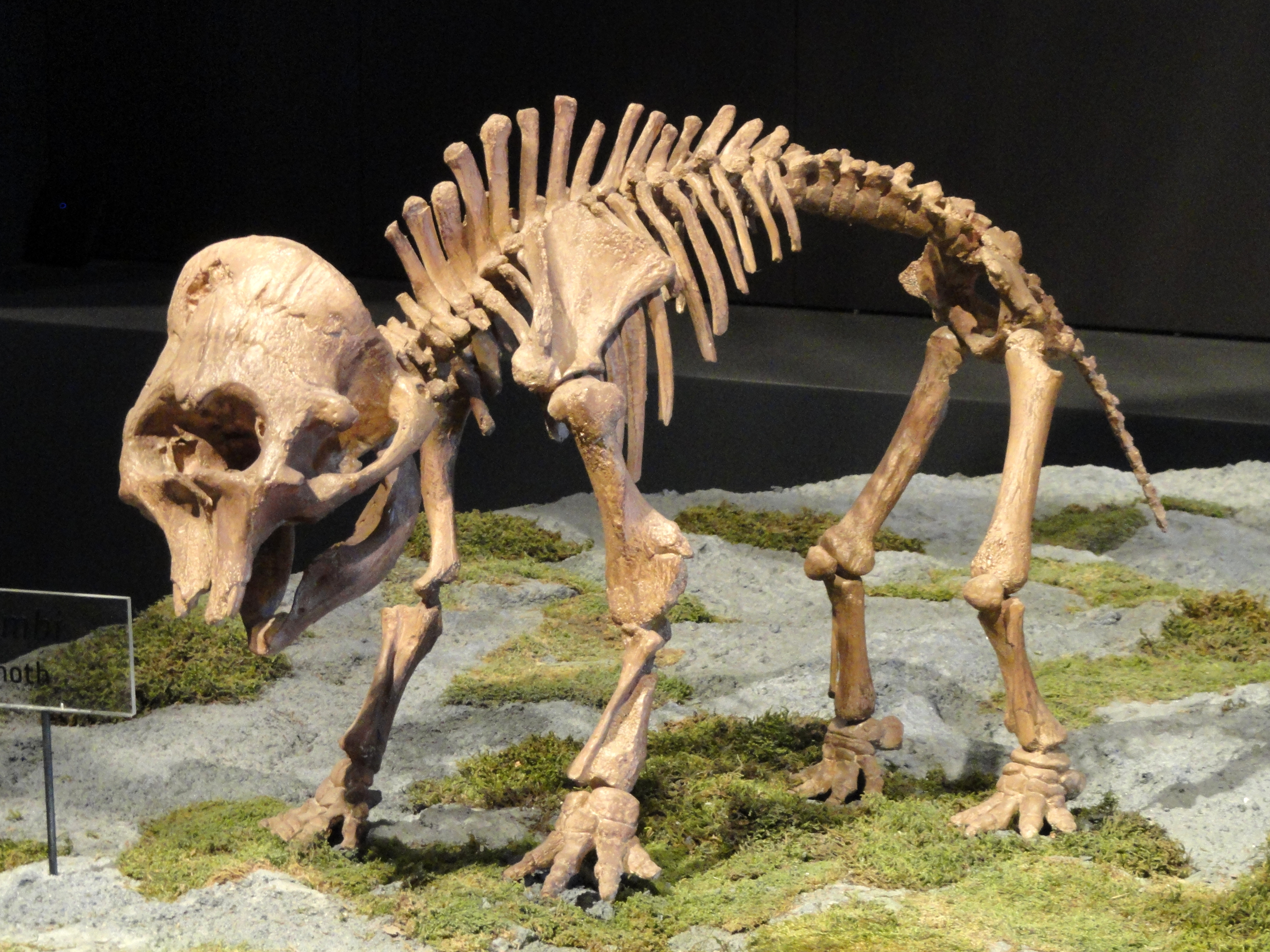
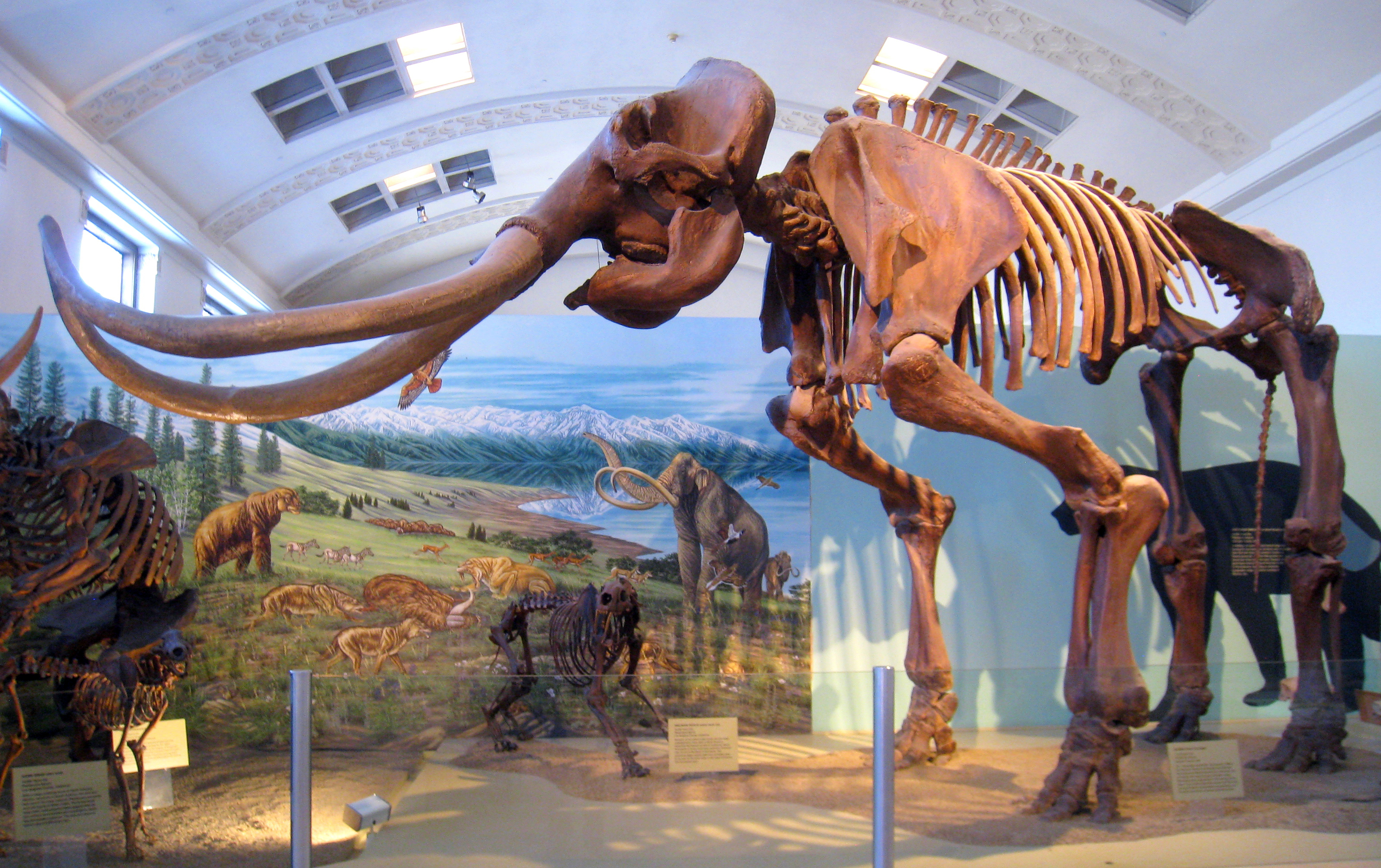
Skeleton of a juvenile (left) and cast of the male "Huntington mammoth" (right), which was old and sick when it died, both at the Natural History Museum of Utah

The lifespan of the Columbian mammoth is thought to have been about 65-80 years. The lifespan of a mammal is related to its size; Columbian mammoths are larger than modern elephants, which have a lifespan of about 60 years. The age of a mammoth can be roughly determined by counting the growth rings of its tusks when viewed in cross section. However, ring-counting does not account for a mammoth's early years; early growth is represented in tusk tips, which are usually worn away. In the remainder of the tusk, each major line represents a year, with weekly and daily lines found in between. Dark bands correspond to summer, making determining the season in which a mammoth died possible. Tusk growth slowed when foraging became more difficult, such as during illness or when a male mammoth was banished from the herd (male elephants live with their herds until about the age of 10).

Mammoths continued growing during adulthood, as do other elephants. Males grew until age 40, and females until age 25. Mammoths may have had gestation periods of 21–22 months, like those of modern elephants. Columbian mammoths had six sets of molars in the course of a lifetime. At 6–12 months, the second set of molars would erupt, with the first set worn out at 18 months of age. The third set of molars lasted for 10 years, and this process was repeated until the sixth set emerged at 30 years of age. When the last set of molars wore out, the animal would be unable to chew, and would die of starvation.

Almost all vertebrae of the "Huntington mammoth", a very aged specimen, were deformed by arthritic disease, and four of its lumbar vertebrae were fused; some bones also indicate bacterial infection, such as osteomyelitis. The condition of the bones suggests the specimen died of old age and malnutrition.

== Distribution and habitat ==
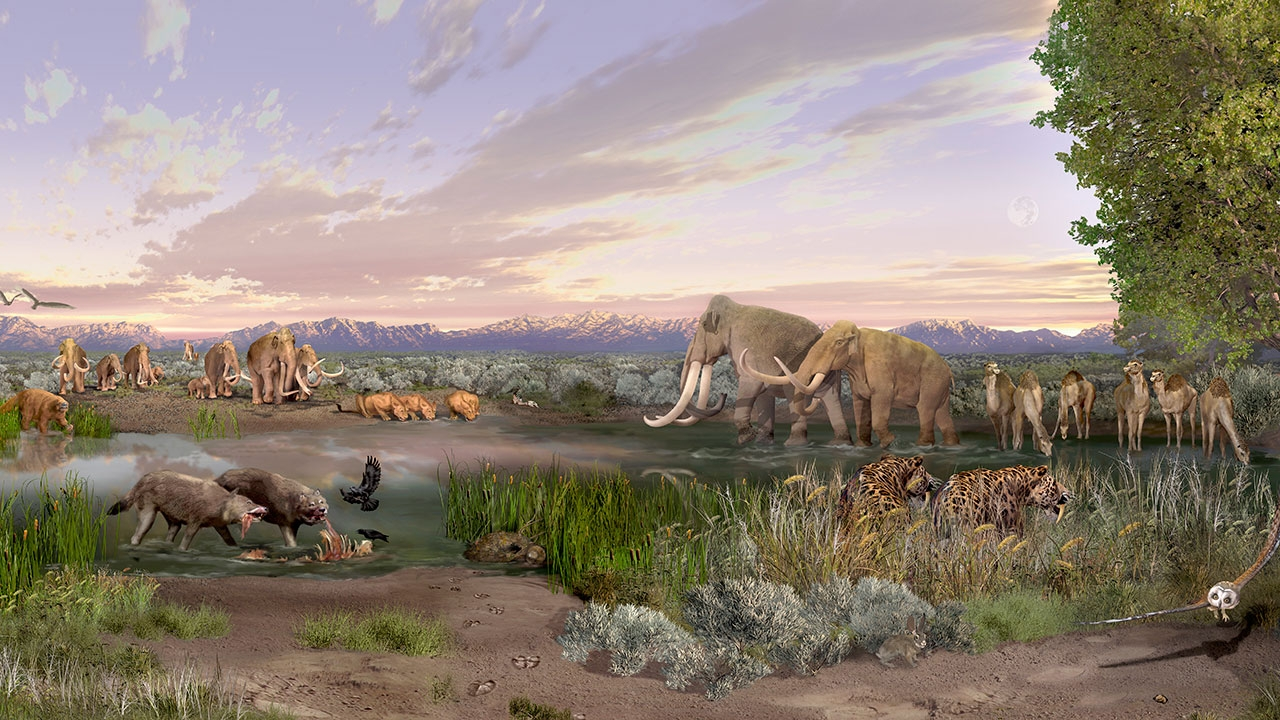
Environment of what is now White Sands National Park, with Columbian mammoth herd in the background

Columbian mammoths inhabited much of North America, ranging from southern Canada to Central America (where it was largely confined to the vicinity of the Pacific coast), with its southernmost record being in northern Costa Rica. The environment in these areas may have had more varied habitats than those inhabited by woolly mammoths in the north (the mammoth steppe). Some areas were covered by grasses, herbaceous plants, trees, and shrubs; their composition varied from region to region, and included grassland, savanna, and aspen parkland habitats. Wooded areas also occurred; although mammoths would not have preferred forests, clearings in them could provide the animals with grasses and herbs.

The Columbian mammoth shared its habitat with other now-extinct Pleistocene mammals such as Glyptotherium, the sabertooth cat Smilodon, ground sloths, the camel Camelops, mastodons, horses, and bison. It did not live in Arctic Canada or Alaska, which was inhabited by woolly mammoths. Fossils of woolly and Columbian mammoths have been found in the same place in a few areas of North America where their ranges overlapped, including the Hot Springs Site. Whether the two species were sympatric and lived there simultaneously, or if the woolly mammoths entered southern areas when Columbian mammoth populations were absent is unknown. The arrival of the Columbian mammoth in North America is thought to have resulted in the extinction of the grazing gomphothere (a relative of elephantids and mastodons) Stegomastodon around 1.2 million years ago, as a result of competitive exclusion as a result of the greater grazing efficiency of Columbian mammoths, with competition with mammoths also suggested to be a reason for the contraction of the northern part of the range, including most of its presence in the United States, of the generalist gomphothere Cuvieronius.

== Relationship with humans ==
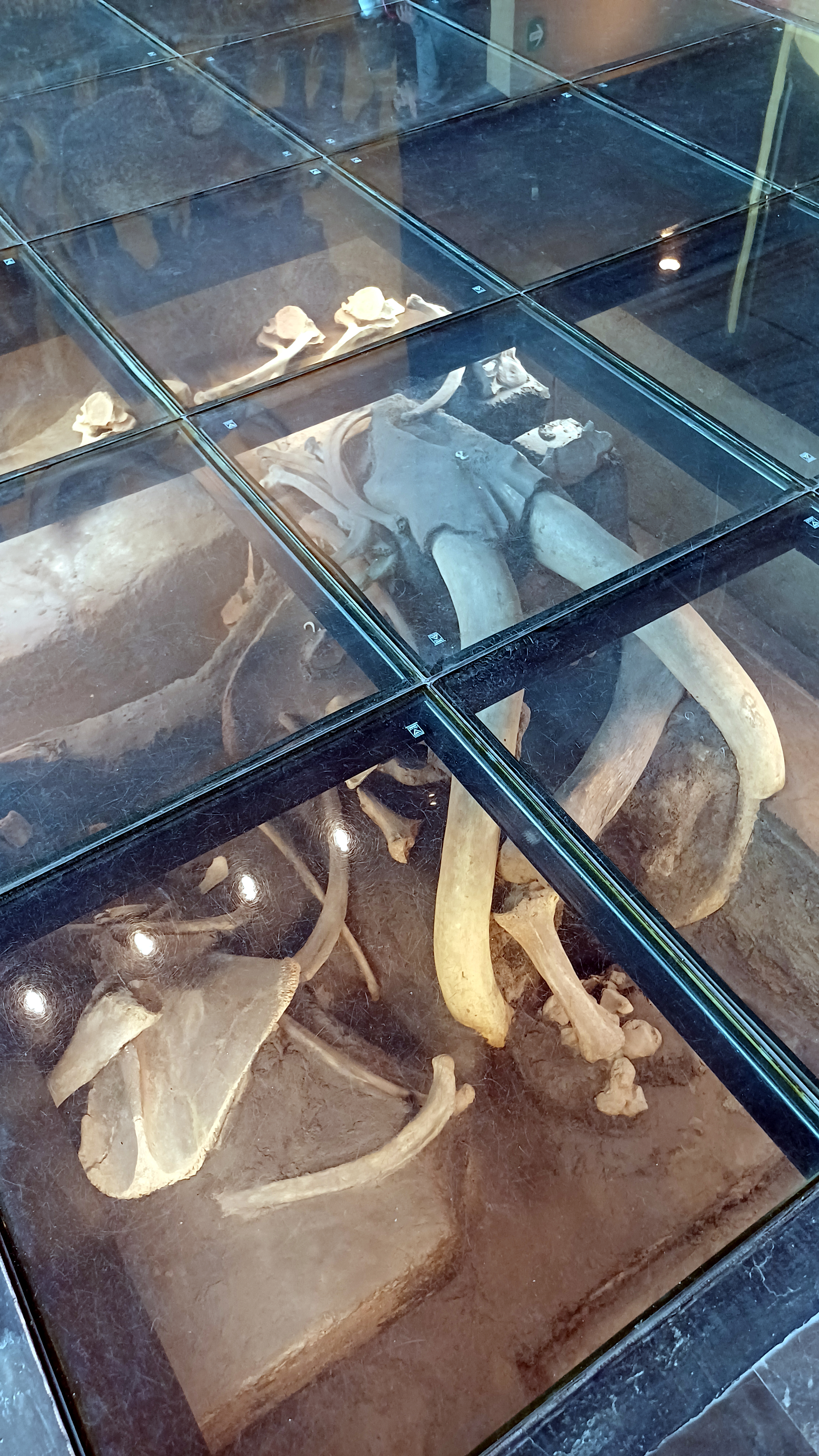
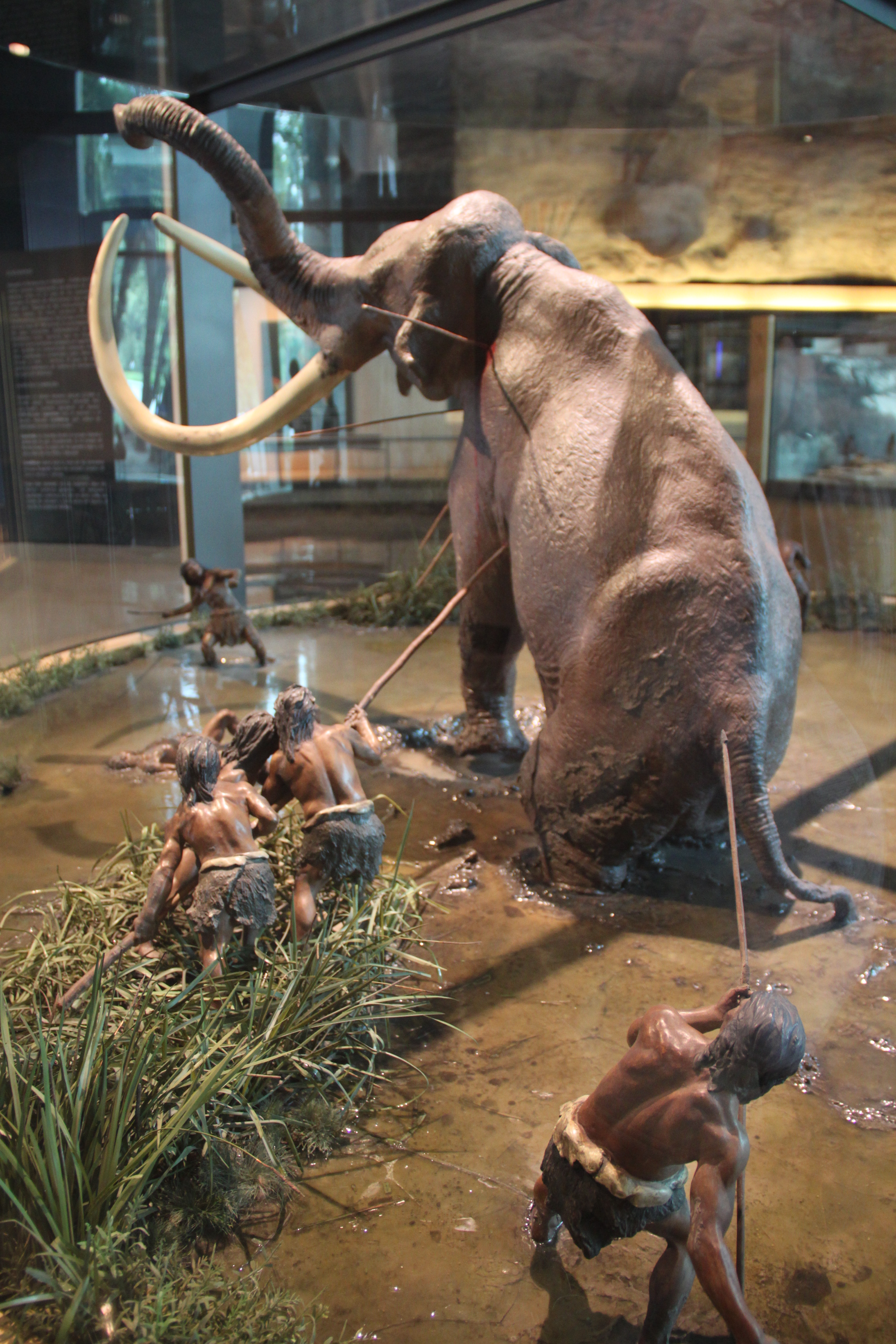
Replica of Columbian mammoth remains (left) and diorama of a hunting scene based on the San Miguel Ixtapan site, National Anthropology Museum, Mexico City

Towards the end of the Late Pleistocene, around or after 16,000 years ago, Paleoindians entered the Americas through the Beringia landbridge, and evidence documents their interactions with Columbian mammoths. Tools made from Columbian mammoth remains have been discovered in several North American sites. At Tocuila, Mexico, mammoth bones were quarried 13,000 years ago to produce lithic flakes and cores. At the Lange-Ferguson Site in South Dakota, the remains of two mammoths were found with two 12,800-year-old cleaver choppers made from a mammoth shoulder blade; the choppers had been used to butcher the mammoths. At the same site, a flake knife made from a long mammoth bone was also found wedged against mammoth vertebrae. At Murray Springs, archeologists discovered a 13,100-year-old object made from a mammoth femur; the object is thought to be a shaft wrench, a tool for straightening wood and bone to make spear-shafts (the Inuit use similar tools).

Although some sites potentially documenting human interactions with Columbian mammoths have been reported from as early as 20,000 years ago, these have been criticized, as they lack stone tools, and the supposed human-made marks on the bones are potentially the result of natural processes. Paleoindians of the Clovis culture, which arose roughly 13,000 years ago may have been the first humans to hunt mammoths extensively. These people are thought to have hunted Columbian mammoths with Clovis pointed spears which were thrown or thrust. Although Clovis points have been found with Columbian mammoth remains at several sites, archeologists disagree about whether the finds represent hunting, scavenging dead mammoths, or are coincidental. A female mammoth at the Naco-Mammoth Kill Site in Arizona, found with eight Clovis points near its skull, shoulder blade, ribs, and other bones, is considered the most convincing evidence for hunting. In modern experiments, replica spears have been able to penetrate the rib cages of African elephants with reuse causing little damage to the points. Columbian mammoths are the animal most strongly associated with the Clovis culture, suggesting a particular importance in their lifestyle over that of other megafauna.

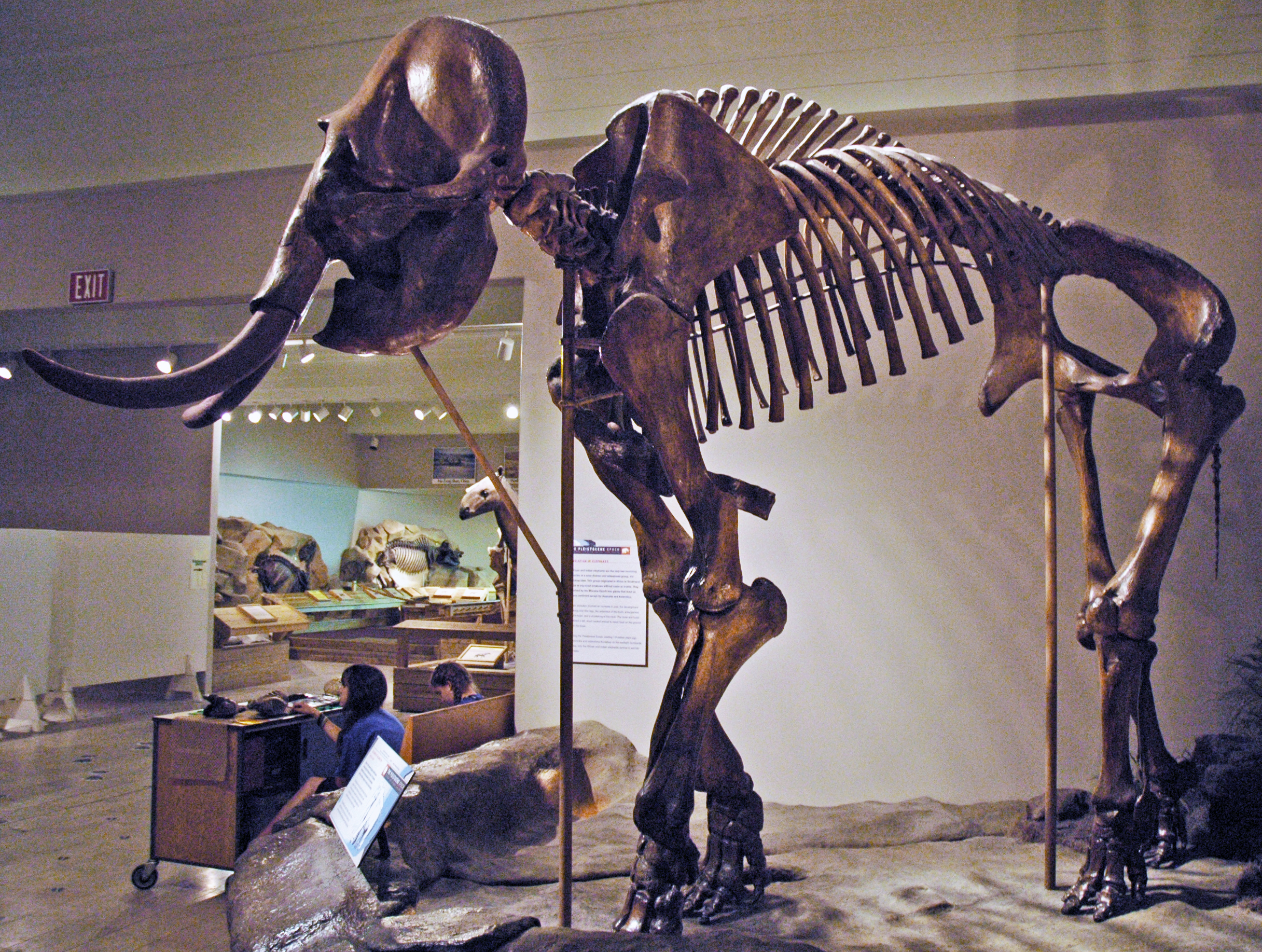
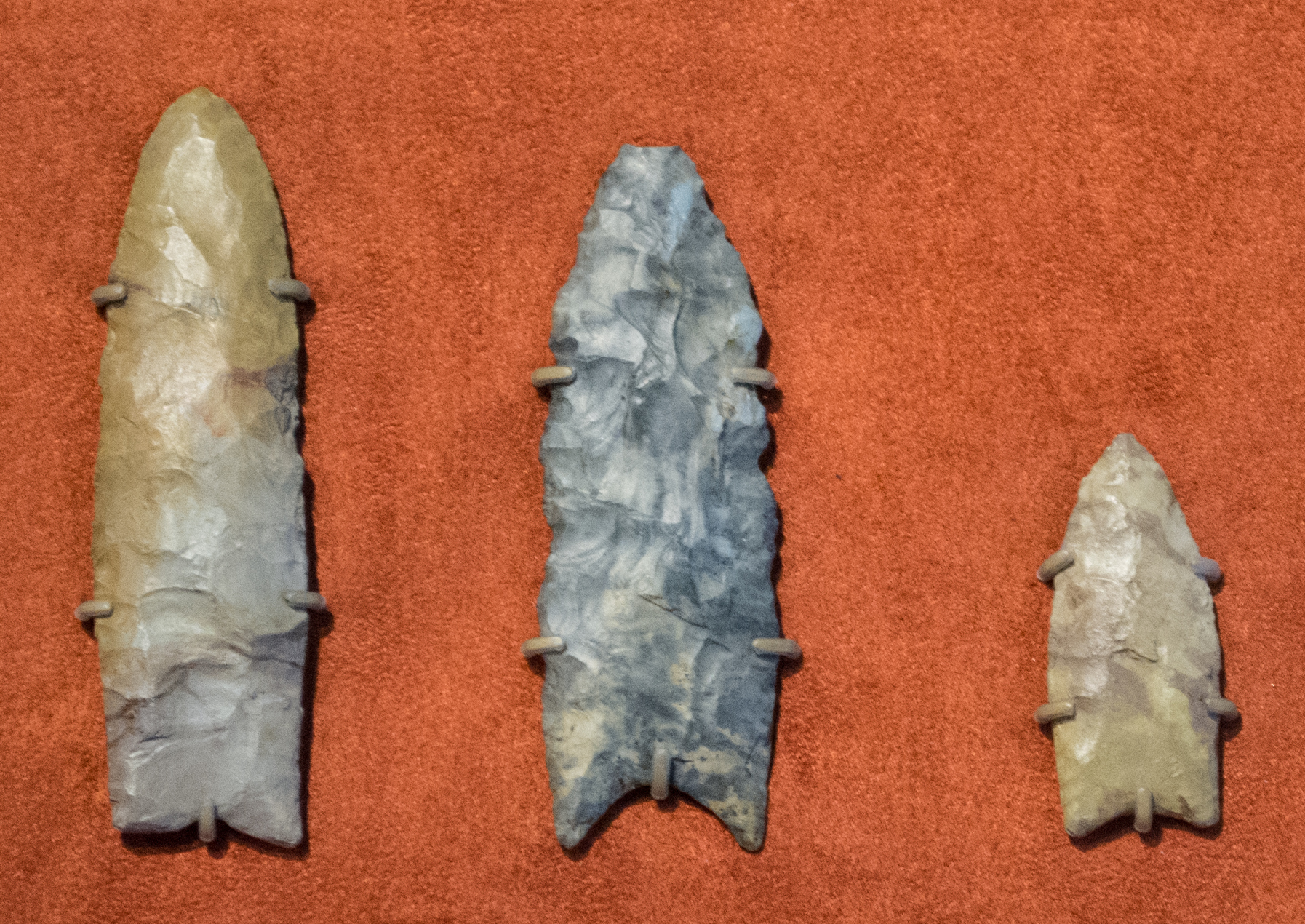
Skeleton found with Clovis points at the Dent site, the first evidence of mammoth hunting in America, Carnegie Museum of Natural History (left), and 13,500–13,000 year old Clovis points at Cleveland Museum of Natural History (right)

Other sites show more circumstantial evidence of mammoth hunting, such as piled bones bearing butcher marks. Some of these sites are not closely associated with Clovis points. The Dent site (the first evidence of mammoth hunting in North America, discovered in 1932) and the Lehner Mammoth-Kill Site, where multiple juvenile and adult mammoths have been found with butcher marks and in association with Clovis points, were once interpreted as the killing of entire herds by Clovis hunters. However, isotope studies have shown that the accumulations represent individual deaths at different seasons of the year, so are not herds killed in single incidents. Many other such assemblages of bones with butcher marks may also represent accumulations over time, so are ambiguous as evidence for large-scale hunting.

A 2021 article by the American paleontologist Metin I. Eren and colleagues suggested mammoths were not very susceptible to Clovis point weapons due to their thick skin, hair, muscles, ribs, and fat, which would have impeded most types of attacks humans could pull off at that time, proposing that Clovis primarily scavenged mammoths. In response, other scientists found no reason to abandon the traditional idea that Clovis points were used to hunt big-game, one suggesting that such spears could have been thrown or thrust at areas of the torso that were not protected by ribs, with the wounds not killing the mammoths instantly, but the hunters could follow their prey until it had bled to death.

2024 isotopic analysis of Anzick-1 a young boy found buried with Clovis culture artifacts in Montana, suggests that Columbian mammoths made up around 35-40% of the diet of his mother, supporting the centrality of mammoth consumption to the lifestyle of Clovis peoples.

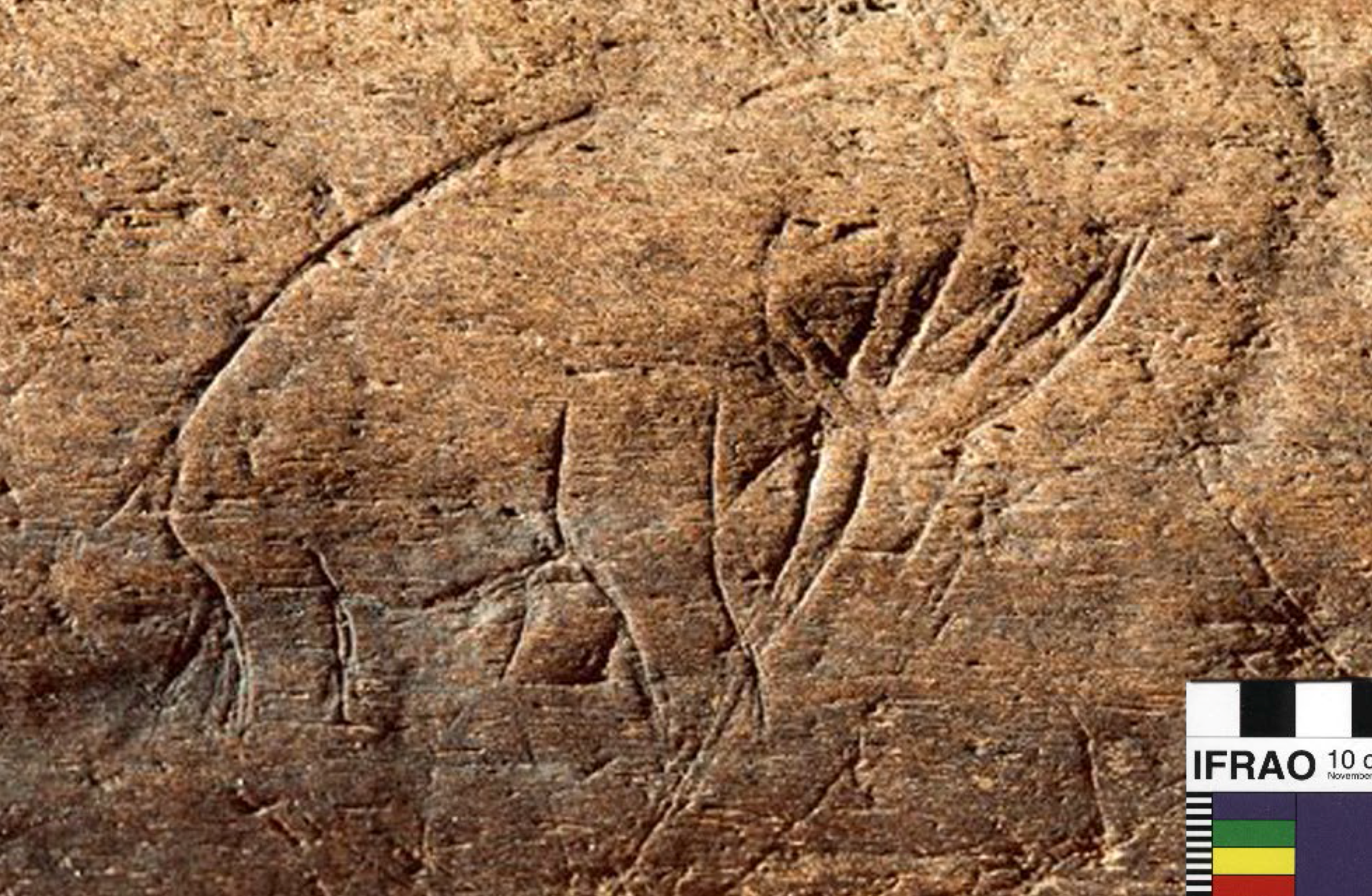
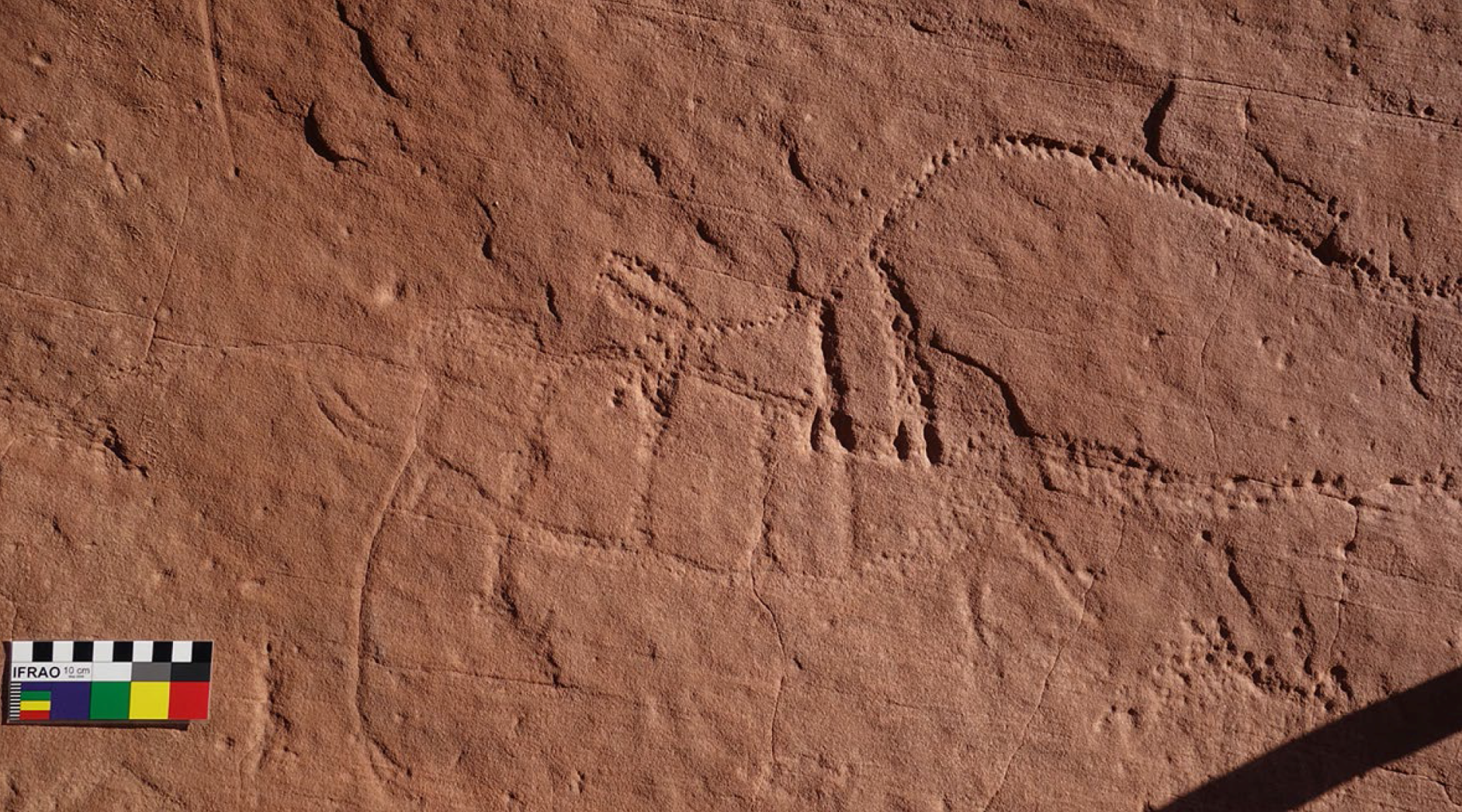
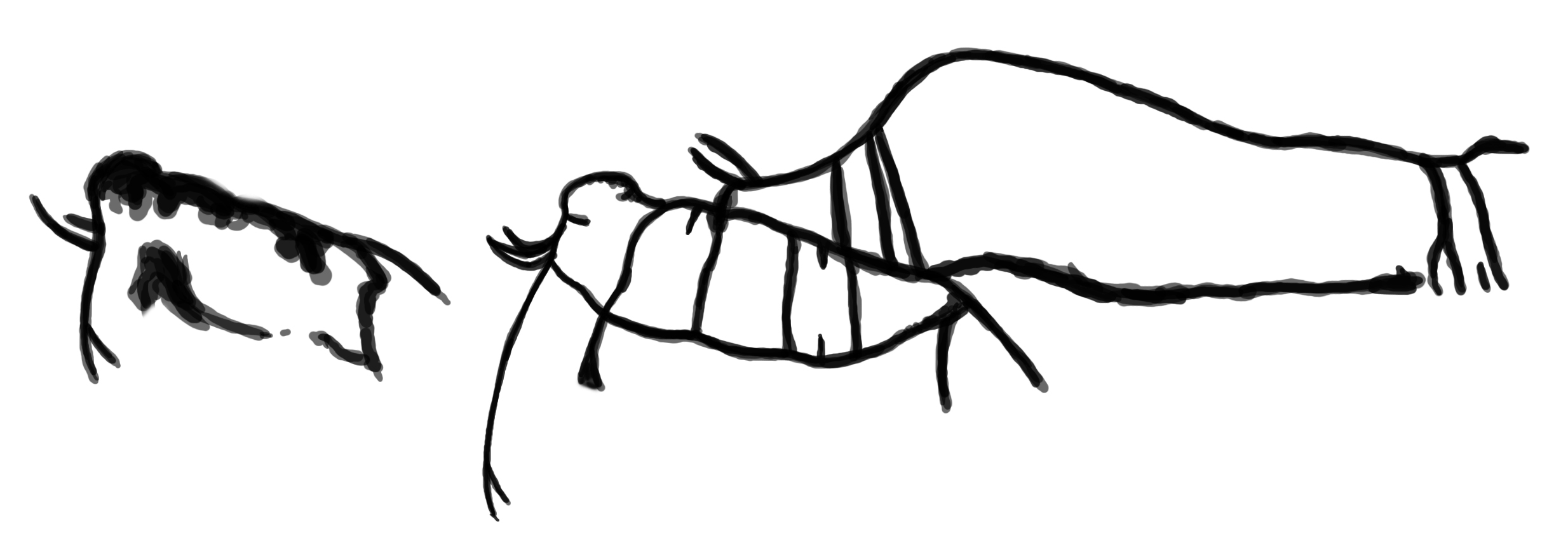
Bone fragment with an engraving of a mammoth from Vero Beach (left), and petroglyphs from Utah supposedly depicting mammoths and a bison (right and below), though they may have been made after mammoths went extinct

Petroglyphs in the Colorado Plateau have been interpreted as depictions of either Columbian mammoths or mastodons. A bone fragment from Vero Beach, Florida, estimated to be 13,000-years old and possibly the earliest known example of art in the Americas, is engraved with either a mammoth or a mastodon. While the authenticity of this depiction is based on continuity of mineralisation across the markings, other possible indicators are inconclusive at present. Petroglyphs from the San Juan River in Utah have been suggested to be 11,000–13,000-years old and to include depictions of two Columbian mammoths; the mammoths' domed heads distinguish them from mastodons. They are also shown with two "fingers" on their trunks, a feature known from European depictions of mammoths. The tusks are short, which may indicate they are meant to be females. A carving of a bison (possibly the extinct Bison antiquus) is superimposed on one of the mammoth carvings and may be a later addition. Geological dating of the San Juan River depictions in 2013 have shown them to be less than 4000 years old, after mammoths and mastodons went extinct, and they may instead be an arrangement of unrelated elements. Other possible depictions of Columbian mammoths have been shown to be either misinterpretations or fraudulent.

The Columbian mammoth is the state fossil of Washington and South Carolina. Nebraska's state fossil is "Archie", a Columbian mammoth specimen found in the state in 1922. "Archie" is currently on display at Elephant Hall in Lincoln, Nebraska, and is the largest mounted mammoth specimen in the United States.

== Extinction ==
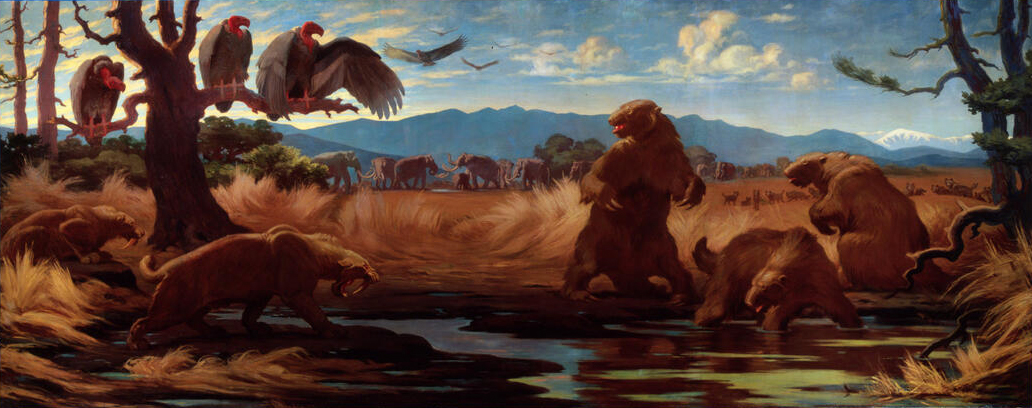
Environment around the La Brea Tar Pits, with Columbian mammoth herd in the background, by Knight, 1921; all the animals depicted disappeared during the Late Pleistocene extinction event

Columbian and woolly mammoths both disappeared from mainland North America by the latest Pleistocene, with no recorded Holocene survival, alongside most other latest Pleistocene megafauna of North America. The latest calibrated radiocarbon date of the Columbian mammoth is in the locality of the Dent site in Colorado which dates to 12,124–12,705 years Before Present, during the onset of the Younger Dryas cold phase (12,900-11,700 years BP) and Clovis culture (13,200-12,800 years BP). Its younger calibrated date compared to most other extinct latest Pleistocene species suggests that it was one of the last North American megafauna to have gone extinct. Amongst the most recent Columbian mammoth remains have been dated around 10,700 years ago, although the date is uncalibrated and therefore is actually older in age. This extinction formed part of the Late Pleistocene extinctions of North America, which coincided with both Clovis culture and the Younger Dryas. Scientists do not know whether these extinctions happened abruptly or were drawn out. During this period, 40 mammal species disappeared from North America, almost all of which weighed over 40 kg (88 lb); the extinction of the mammoths cannot be explained in isolation.

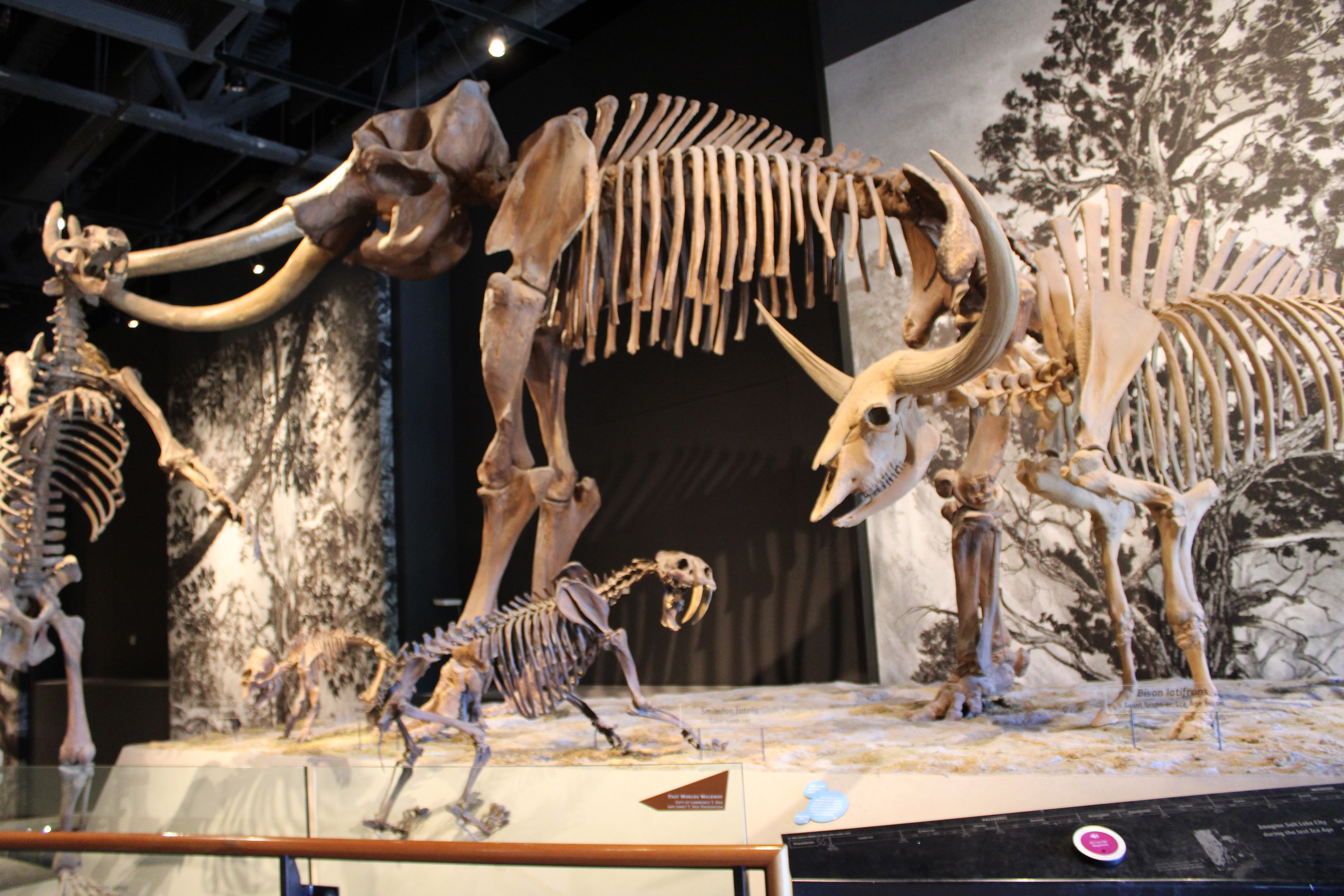
Skeletons of a Columbian mammoth and other North American mammals that went extinct during the Late Pleistocene, Natural History Museum of Utah

Scientists are divided over whether climate change, hunting, or a combination of the two, drove the extinction of the Columbian mammoths. According to the climate-change hypothesis, warmer weather led to the shrinking of suitable habitat for Columbian mammoths, which turned from parkland to forest, grassland, and semidesert, with less diverse vegetation. The "overkill hypothesis" attributes the extinction to hunting by humans, an idea first proposed by geoscientist Paul S. Martin in 1967; more recent research on this subject has varied in conclusions.

A 2002 study concluded that the archeological record did not support the "overkill hypothesis", given that only 14 Clovis sites (12 with mammoth remains and two with mastodon remains) out of 76 examined provided strong evidence of hunting. In contrast, a 2007 study found that the Clovis record indicated the highest frequency of prehistoric exploitation of proboscideans for subsistence in the world, and supported the "overkill hypothesis". A mathematical modelling study conducted in 2015 showed that overkill alone could have plausibly caused the demise of the Columbian mammoth. A 2019 study that used mathematical modelling to simulate correlations between migrations of humans and Columbian mammoths also supported the "overkill hypothesis". Whatever the actual cause of extinction, large mammals are generally more susceptible to hunting pressure than smaller ones due to their smaller population size and low reproduction rates. On the other hand, large mammals are generally less vulnerable to climatic stresses since they have greater fat deposits at their disposal and can migrate long distances to escape food shortages.
