= Bernard Buigues =

French explorer

- Born: 19 July 1954 (age 71)
- Occupations: Explorer, Founder of the Mammuthus Program

Bernard Buigues (born 19 July 1954, in Fes, Morocco) is a French explorer who has organized expeditions to the North Pole and Siberia since the early 1990s. He has developed a logistical base in Khatanga, Northern Siberia for the launching of high-latitude expeditions. He is the founder and leader of Mammuthus, a scientific expedition-centered program aimed at constructing a record of paleobiodiversity through the collection and preservation of fossils throughout the Siberian Arctic. This collection is poised to provide insight into environmental mechanics, ecosystems, the evolution and extinction of species, as well as their interactions. Bernard Buigues is credited with three important discoveries in Siberia — the Jarkov Mammoth, Yukagir mammoth and Lyuba, the 42,000-year-old baby mammoth featured in the National Geographic documentary "Waking the Baby Mammoth" and displayed at the "Mammoths and Mastodons: Titans of the Ice Age exhibition" at the Field Museum in Chicago. Bernard Buigues is also one of the initiators of Tara expedition, a multi-year program dedicated to adding to earlier understandings of the origins of ocean life and famed for the 2007–2008, 1,800-km Arctic drift.
