= Nun Cho Ga =

Mummified woolly mammoth specimen

Nun Cho Ga is a mummified ice age specimen of a woolly mammoth older than 30,000 years (upper Pleistocene).

== Discovery ==
It was found by gold miners on June 21, 2022, in the Un Klondike area of Yukon in northern Canada. The find site belongs to Trʼondëk Hwëchʼin First Nation. The mammoth baby, thought to be female, was named Nun Cho Ga, meaning "Big Baby Animal" in the Hän language spoken by the Indigenous peoples of the area. It is thought to be the same size as Lyuba, the 42,000-year-old Siberian baby Mammoth found in Siberia in 2007.

== See also ==
- List of mammoth specimens
