= Dick Mol =

Dutch paleontologist

- Born: 26 June 1955 (age 70)
- Scientific career
- Fields: Paleontology

Dick "Sir Mammoth" Mol (born June 26, 1955) is a Dutch paleontologist - a specialist in the field of mammoths for almost three decades. He is a research associate of several museums. Mol's primary focus is on mammals of the Quaternary period, including mammoths and extinct rhinoceros species.

== Biography ==
=== Early life and education ===
Dick Mol was born in Winterswijk, Gelderland (The Netherlands), in 1955, as one of nine children, Mol could not afford to attend higher education after high school, and so he joined customs service in 1974. As the Netherlands implemented the Convention on International Trade in Endangered Species of Wild Fauna and Flora (CITES), Dick Mol was trained to be a CITES specialist, spending much time on the job studying bones, eventually accumulating ample knowledge to compensate for an academic career.

=== Career ===
Dick has catalogued fossil remains dredged from the bottom of the North Sea, and published over fifty papers on his finds. Since 1990, he has been associated with The Mammoth Site in Hot Springs, South Dakota, collaborating with Larry Agenbroad on four papers dealing with field and laboratory research in paleontology, geology and paleoecology. In 1999, Dick contributed his expertise to the project for excavating the frozen remains of the Jarkov Mammoth led by Bernard Buigues, which was chronicled in the Discovery Channel's second highest-rated documentary “Raising the Mammoth". Dick returned to Siberia several times, continuing the search and study of Pleistocene remains on the Taimyr Peninsula using an ice cave in Khatanga, Russia. He was also part of the team that recovered the Yukagir mammoth in Yakutia, which has been on display at Expo 2005 in Aichi Japan (Mol et al. 2006c). He is coordinator of the Cerpolex/Mammuthus program, “Who or What Killed the Mammoths”.

His goal is to learn more about all of the Pleistocene fauna that lived on the Pleistocene Mammoth steppe, which included the Taimyr Peninsula, but also the North Sea, the low countries and the UK. Throughout his career, Mol has cataloged numerous fossil remains dredged from the bottom of the North Sea. The last years he has been co-operating with Professor Evangelia Tsoukala in Greece, excavating mastodons in Greek Macedonia. With Frédéric Lacombat he is studying the extinct Proboscidea of the Haute-Loire, Auvergne, France.

His work has brought him international recognition for his studies on Quaternary paleontology, the study of the Pleistocene and today's Holocene Epochs

=== Affiliations ===
Research associate at the

- Natural History Museum at Rotterdam, The Netherlands (since 1994).
- Musée Crozatier, Le Puy-en-Velay, France (since 2008).
- Natural History Museum of Milea, Grevena, Greece (since 2006).
- Siatista Historical Paleontological Collection, Siatista, Greece (since 2010).

Scientific coordinator of the scientific programme “Who or What killed the Mammoths” (Saint-Mandé, France and Khatanga – Siberia, Russia) (since 1998)

=== Personal life ===
Dick Mol is married to Friedje and has two children. He lives in Hoofddorp, The Netherlands.

== Publications ==
=== Books ===
Dick Mol wrote several book in the Dutch language, these are available in English:

- Mol, Dick; Lacombat, Frédéric (2010). Mammoths & Mastodons of Haute-Loire. Drukware. p. 271. ISBN 978-2-911794-97-1. (English and French)
- Dick Mol; Wilrie van Logchem; Kees van Hooydonk; Remie Bakker (2008). The Saber-Toothed Cat of the North Sea. Drukware. p. 159. ISBN 978-90-78707-04-2.
- Dick Mol (1993). Mammoths. Mammoth Site of Hot Springs South (October 1993). ISBN 978-0-9624750-2-3.

=== Selected articles ===
Mol, D., P.J.H. van Bree en G.H. McDonald(2003), De Amsterdamse collectie fossielen uit de Grot van Ultima Esperanza.(Patagonië, Zuid-Chili). Grondboor & Hamer nr.2, p. 26-36 (translation in progress)

Dick Mol; et al. (2006a). "Results of the CERPOLEX/Mammuthus Expeditions on the Taimyr Peninsula, Arctic Siberia, Russian Federation" (PDF). Quaternary International. 142–143: 186–202. Bibcode:2006QuInt.142..186M. doi:10.1016/j.quaint.2005.03.016. hdl:11370/e006a7ad-97cb-44a0-85d3-e35c964a93f2.

Dick Mol; et al. (2006b). "The Yukagir Mammoth: Brief History, 14C Dates, Individual Age, Gender, Size, Physical and Environmental Conditions and Storage" (PDF). Scientific Annals, School of Geology Aristotle University of Thessaloniki, Special Volume 98, Pages 299-314.

Dick Mol; et al. (2006c). "The Eurogeul—first report of the palaeontological, palynological and archaeological investigations of this part of the North Sea" (PDF). Quaternary International Volumes 142–143 January 2006, Pages 178–185. Archived from the original (PDF) on 2012-04-26.

== Legacy ==
- Knight in the order of Oranje Nassau (2000)
