= Jarkov Mammoth =

Mammoth specimen

Coordinates: 73°32′N 105°49′E

The Jarkov Mammoth (named for the family who discovered it), is a woolly mammoth specimen discovered on the Taymyr Peninsula of Siberia by a nine-year-old boy in 1997. This particular mammoth is estimated to have lived about 20,000 years ago. It is likely to be male and probably died at age 47.

== Discovery ==
Simion Jarkov was a young Dolgan living in the village of Khatanga, 500 miles (800 km) north of the Arctic Circle. Jarkov was visiting his family approximately 150 miles (240 km) further north in Novorybnoye. While hunting near 73°32'N, 105°49'E, he discovered the curved, 30-centimetre (12 in) tips of the tusks, which his brother reported to the Taymyr Nature Reserve. An attempt was initially made to move the tusks. The director, Yurik Karbuinov, said:

At first they tried to move the tusks, but I advised them to secure the site because it seemed to be a unique find.

The Nature Reserve did not initially investigate the find, so the Jarkovs contacted a Siberia specialist who would become a well-known mammoth-hunter Bernard Buigues. On 18 October 1999, the 23 tonne block of mud and ice was lifted via Mil Mi-26 heavy-load transport helicopter to the ice cave in Khatanga.

== Research ==
The Jarkov Mammoth was recovered from a 23 tonne frozen block and transported to Khatanga under the supervision of French mammoth-hunter Bernard Buigues.

It currently resides in an ice cave where over 36 scientists from around the world, including Russian mammoth expert Alexei Tikhonov, study the find. The excavation and ongoing study of the Jarkov Mammoth has been recorded by the Discovery Channel.

Bone marrow and Pleistocene plant samples have been removed and sent to various laboratories for analysis as the mammoth thaws. As of 2001, the intactness of the mammoth is unknown. Over 50 samples from the Jarkov Mammoth have been carbon-14 dated. Indications are that mammoths roamed the Taimyr region for tens of thousands of years.

Scientists have determined that there were two periods when the mammoths departed the region, either in search of food or to escape flooding: 34,000 to 30,000 BC and 17,000 to 12,000 BC. The Jarkov Mammoth is believed to have lived between these two periods, c. 18,380 BC.

== Cloning ==
Some scientists have expressed hopes that mammoth DNA may be extracted and cloned to bring the species back from extinction. However, other scientists, such as Alexei Tikhonov, have expressed concerns of the viability of any genetic material extracted. According to Tikhonov:

You have to have a living cell for cloning, and not a single cell can survive in the permafrost.

== See also ==
- List of mammoths
- Adams mammoth
- Lyuba mammoth
- Sopkarga mammoth (Zhenya)
- Yuka mammoth
- Yukagir mammoth
