= Oyogos Yar coast =

Coastal area in northeast Russia

Coordinates: 72.683470°N 143.475260°E

The Oyogos Yar Coast is a coastal area in Sakha, found in northeast Siberia and part of the Russian Far East. It is located near the Laptev Sea.

The region has been the site of various paleontology studies. In 2010, the local people of Yukagir, a village near the coast, found a well-preserved woolly mammoth carcass. The specimen was nicknamed Yuka.
