= Sopkarga mammoth =

Coordinates: 71.8722°N 82.7117°E

- Interactive map of Sopkarga mammoth
- Type: Mummified remains
- Periods: 48,000 cal ka BP
- Location: Bluff that formed right bank of the Yenisei River
- Region: Taymyr Peninsula

Site notes
- Archaeologists: Yevgeny Salinder
- Discovered: 28 August 2012

The Sopkarga mammoth, alternately spelled Sopkarginsky mammoth, and informally called Zhenya, after the nickname of its discoverer, is a woolly mammoth carcass found in October 2012. It was discovered 3 kilometres (2 mi) away from the Sopkarga polar weather station on the Taymyr Peninsula in Russia. The Moscow News refers to it as the best preserved mammoth find in the past 100 years.

The remains are those of a male, aged 15 to 16 years, who died c. 48,000 years ago. They weigh over 500 kilograms (1,100 lb), comprising the right half of the body including soft tissue, skin and hair, the skull with one ear, a tusk, bones and reproductive organs.

This find is the best-preserved of its kind since another mammoth was unearthed in 1901 near the Beryozovka River in Yakutia. This makes Zhenya the second-best preserved mammoth ever found.

Over the course of a week, the frozen carcass was extracted using steam, axes, and picks. It was then transported by helicopter to Dudinka, the capital of Taymyr, and placed in an ice chamber.

Zhenya's hump appears to be composed of fat, similar to a camel's hump.

The remains were found by 11-year-old Yevgeny Salinder who lives near the station. His nickname is "Zhenya".

== See also ==
- List of mammoth specimens
- Adams mammoth
- Jarkov Mammoth
- Lyuba Mammoth
- Yuka Mammoth
- Yukagir Mammoth
