= Mayborn Museum Complex =

Natural history museum in Texas, United States

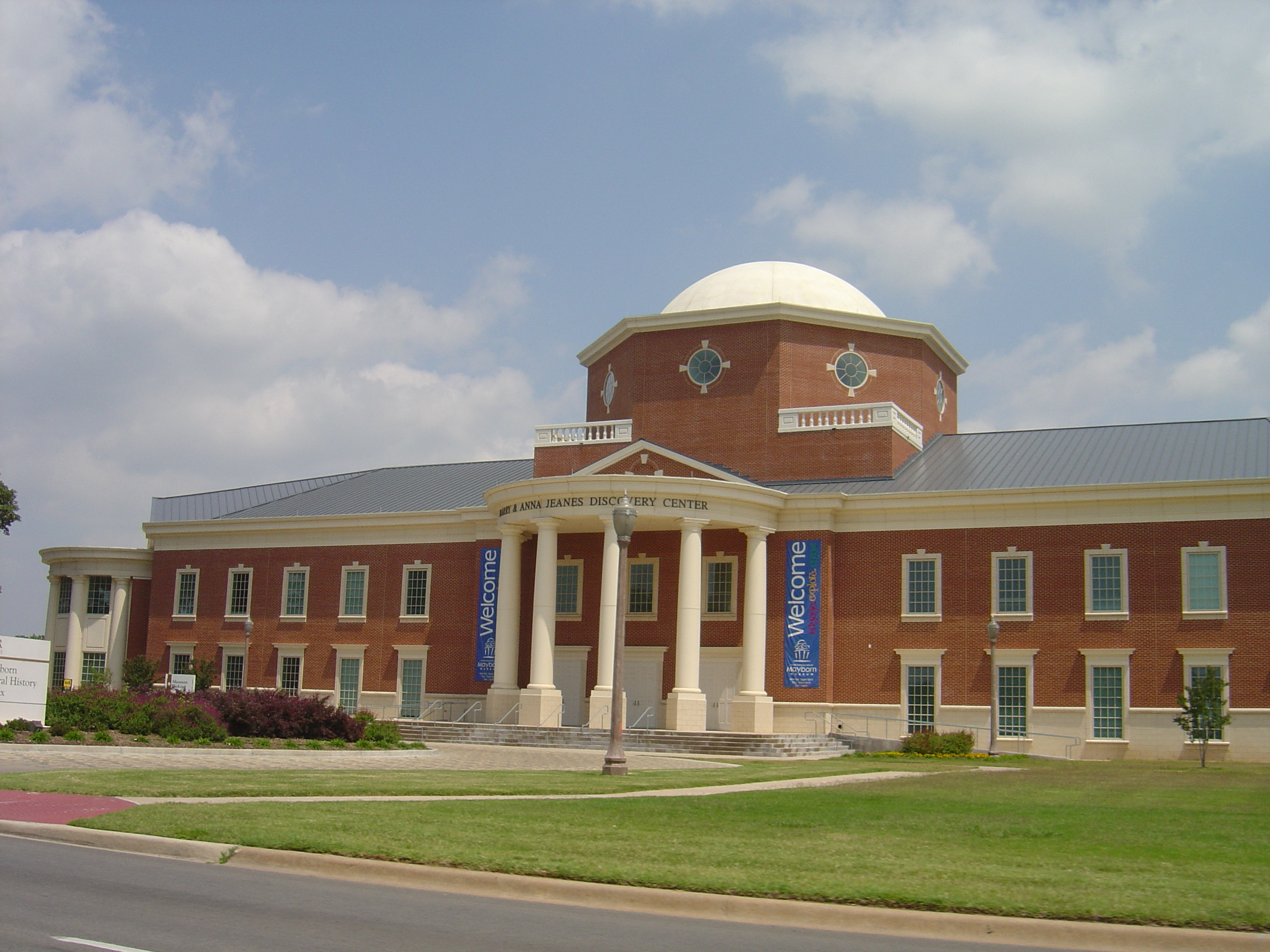
- Established: 2004
- Location: 1300 S. University Parks Drive; Waco, Texas
- Coordinates: 31.5517°N 97.1152°W
- Type: Natural History Museum, Children's, Open-air
- Accreditation: American Alliance of Museums, Smithsonian Affiliate
- Key holdings: Waco Mammoth National Monument Repository
- Collections: Archeology, Biology, Ethnology, History, Paleontology
- Director: Charlie Walter
- Owner: Baylor University
- Parking: On site (no charge)
- Website: www.baylor.edu/mayborn

The Sue & Frank Mayborn Natural Science and Cultural History Museum Complex (abbreviated as MMC) is a 142,000-square-foot (13,200 m^{2}) facility that opened in May 2004 at Baylor University in Waco, Texas. The complex features a natural history wing with exhibits on prehistoric Central Texas, dioramas featuring landscapes of the area, and examples of the homes utilized by 19th Century residents of Texas, The Harry and Anna Jeanes Discovery center with two floors of hands-on experiences for all ages, and The 13-acre (53,000 m^{2}) Governor Bill and Vara Daniel Historic Village. The complex also features the 5,000 sq ft (460 m^{2}) Anding Traveling Exhibit Gallery, a theater, and a museum store.

== History ==
The Mayborn Museum Complex is made up of three previous institutions, The Strecker Museum, The Ollie Mae Moen Discovery Center, and the Governor Bill and Vara Daniel Historic Village.

=== The Strecker Museum ===
The Baylor University Museum can be traced back to 1856, when an advertisement in the 1856-1857 annual catalogue called for a "telescope, microscope, and contributions for a cabinet for minerals, shells, and petrifactions." to be used for a teaching collection. This collection eventually became the university museum and was later named for its curator, John Kern Strecker, in 1940. Under Strecker, the museum's collections were greatly expanded through trading with other institutions and large donations, including his personal collection of birds, mammals, and reptiles.

The Strecker Museum was housed in various locations on the Baylor campus prior to the construction of the Mayborn Museum Complex, including Caroll Library, Pat Neff Hall, and the Sid Richardson Science Building, where it was permanently housed from 1968 until 2003.

Until its closure to relocate to the Mayborn Museum Complex in 2003, the Strecker Museum was the oldest continuously operating museum in Texas.

=== The Ollie Mae Moen Discovery Center ===
In response to a call for a place where local children could find excitement for learning, the Youth Cultural Center was founded in 1965, led by Ollie Mae Moen. Moen led the organization until her retirement in 1982, and it was renamed in her honor in 1994.

=== The Governor Bill and Vara Daniel Historic Village ===
The Historic Village was donated to Baylor University by Governor Bill Daniel and his family in 1985. The buildings that comprise today's Village were relocated from Plantation Ranch in Liberty, Texas. The Village offers visitors a representation of rural Texas in the 1890s as portrayed in 9 restored buildings.

== See also ==
- List of museums in Central Texas
