= Waco Mammoth National Monument =

National Monument of the United States in Texas

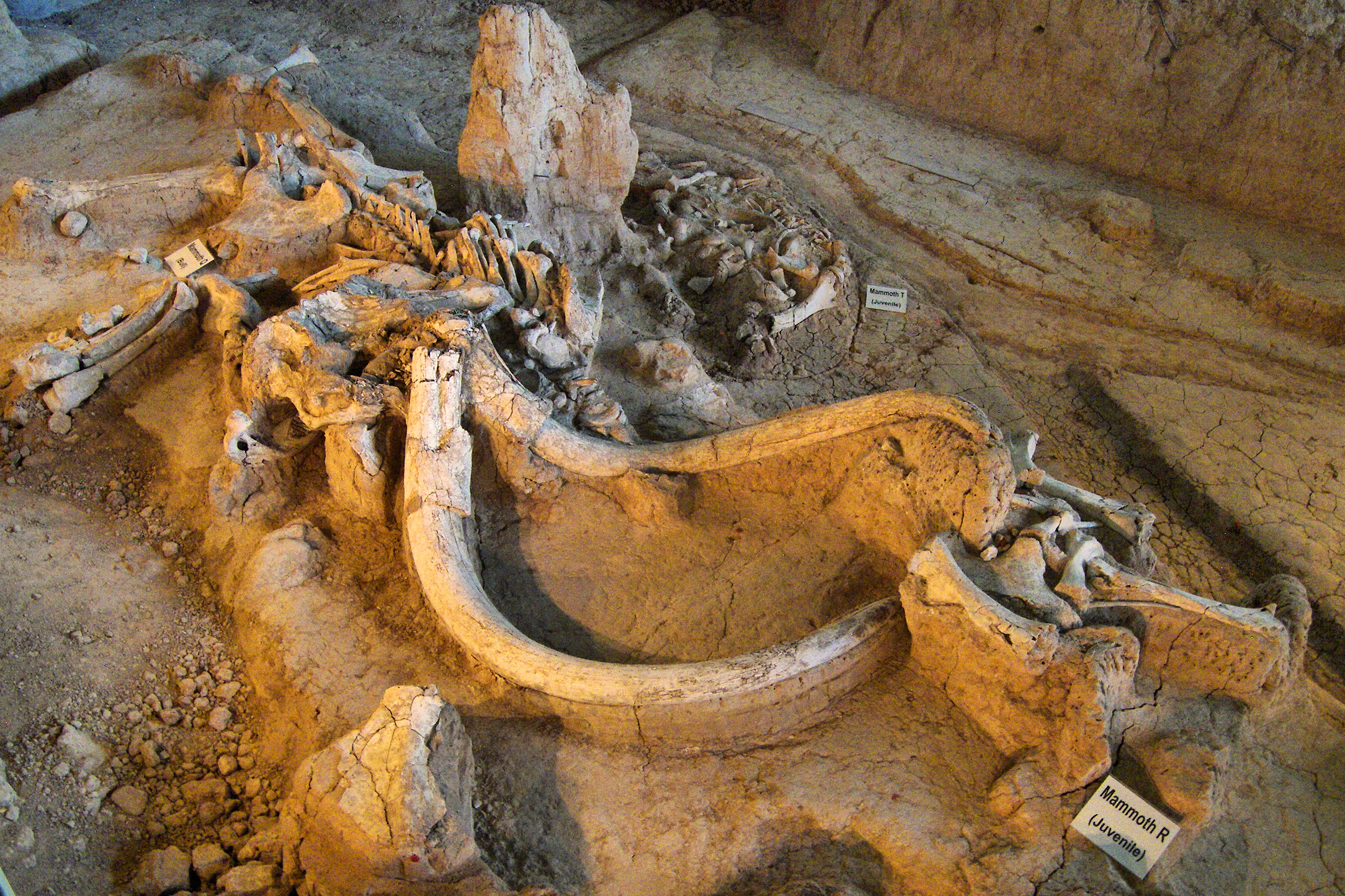
- Columbian mammoth bull and juvenile remains at the Waco Mammoth National Monument

- Location within Texas Location within the United States
- Interactive map of Waco Mammoth National Monument
- Location: Waco, Texas
- Nearest city: Waco, Texas
- Coordinates: 31°36′21.6″N 97°10′30″W
- Area: 5 acres (2.0 ha)
- Created: July 10, 2015
- Visitors: 91,678 (in 2025)
- Governing body: National Park Service, City of Waco, Baylor University
- Website: Waco Mammoth National Monument

U.S. National Monument
- Designated: July 10, 2015

The Waco Mammoth National Monument is a paleontological site and museum in Waco, Texas, United States, where fossils of 24 Columbian mammoths (Mammuthus columbi) and other mammals from the Pleistocene epoch have been uncovered. The site is the largest known concentration of mammoths dying from a (possibly) reoccurring event, which is believed to have been a flash flood. The mammoths on site did not all die at the same time, but rather during three separate events in the same area. A local partnership developed around the site after the initial bone was discovered. The Waco Mammoth Foundation worked in partnership with the City of Waco and Baylor University to develop the site. Baylor's involvement mainly included the research, preservation, and storage of materials from the site, while Waco contributed to the protection of the land. In 2015, they successfully sought the National Monument designation to bring the expertise of the National Park Service into the partnership.

== History ==
=== Depiction of a Columbian mammoth ===
Columbian mammoths lived 10,000 to 1 million years ago. They migrated to North America and as far south as Nicaragua. The Columbian mammoth was a herbivore, with a diet consisting of varied plant life ranging from grasses to conifers. At that time, the Central Texas landscape consisted of temperate grasslands and savannahs surrounded by river floodplains.

How the animals at the site died is unknown, but no evidence has been found to show that humans were involved. The current theory is that about 68,000 years ago, at least 19 mammoths from a nursery herd were trapped in a steep-sided channel during a flash flood and drowned and/or were buried by mud. A camel was also trapped and killed during this event. Later floods buried the remains. A second event took place sometime later. During this event, an unidentified animal associated with a juvenile saber-toothed cat (genus Smilodon) died and was buried. The third event claimed the lives of a bull mammoth, two juvenile mammoths, and an adult female. Around 15,000 years after the nursery herd was trapped, these animals also appear to have been victims of rising water, unable to escape due to the slippery slopes of the surrounding channel.

The age of the fossils was determined using luminescence dating, specifically optically stimulated luminescence of the sediment, which uses light to excite electrons and cause the emission of photons. The photons can be sensed and measured to calculate when the sediment was last exposed to the sun. The soil near the mammoths' remains was examined to determine how long the minerals were buried. As the soil was buried at the same time as the mammoths, determining when the soil was last exposed to the sun would correlate to the time when the mammoths perished.

=== Discovery ===
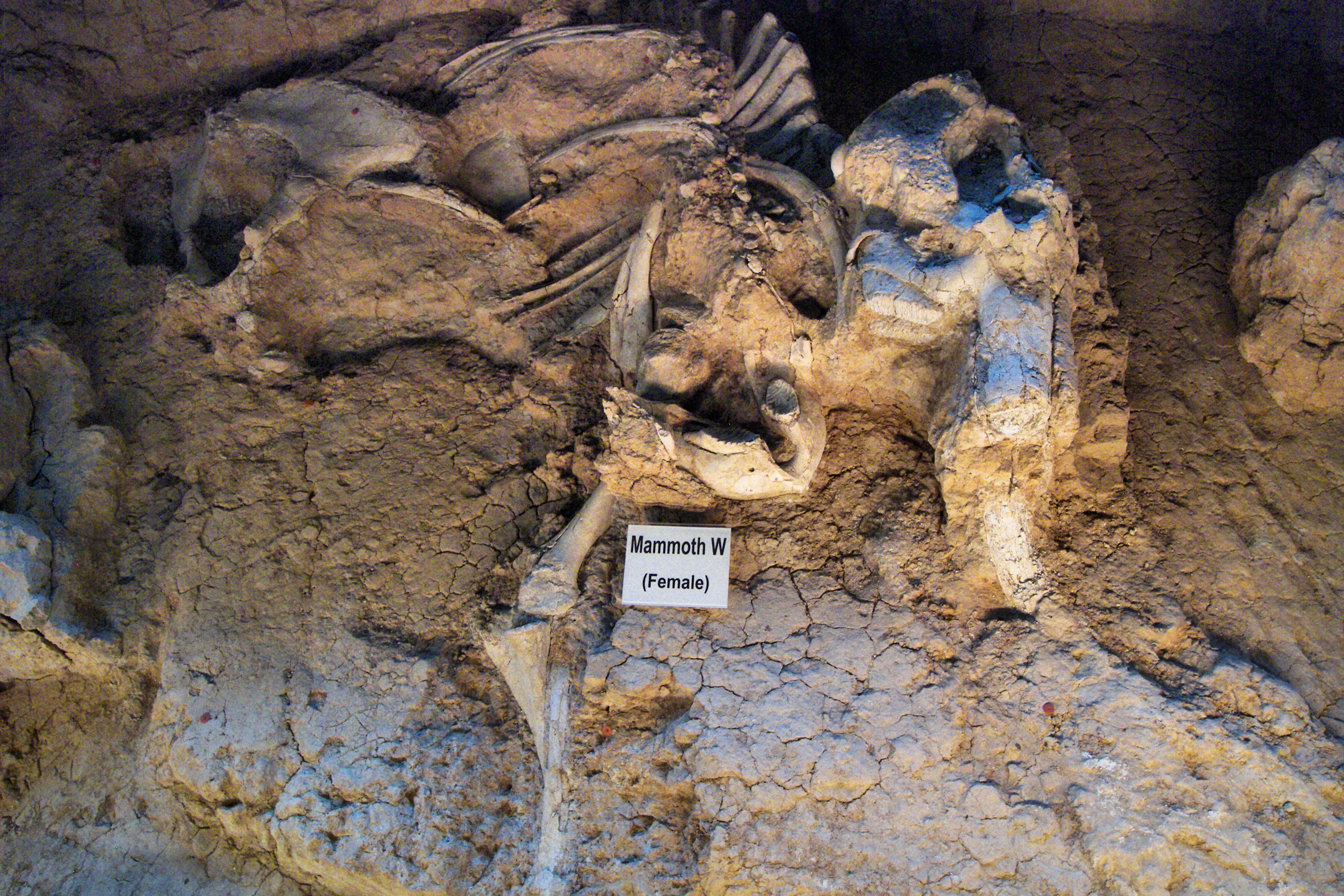
Female "mammoth W" specimen at the Waco Mammoth National Monument

The site was discovered in 1978 by late teens Paul Barron and Eddie Bufkin, who were searching for arrowheads and fossils on a farm near the Bosque River. They found a large bone, and thinking it was a cattle bone, decided to take it to the owner of the farm. After pulling it completely out of the ground, they discovered that the bone was 3 feet long, much too big to be a cattle bone. They then took it to the Strecker Museum at Baylor University for analysis. Once the bone was identified as Columbian mammoth, the museum staff organized a formal dig at the site lasting from 1978 to 1990. In 1979, George F. Naryshkin (then an undergraduate at Baylor) began work on his 2 1/2-year excavation and study of the site.

He asked for and received permission from the owners of the property to excavate the area. George named the site the "Waco Mammoth Site" and uncovered five mammoths at the time and in 1980 completed his senior thesis on the site titled "The Significance of the Waco Mammoth site to Central Texas Pleistocene History". He aged the site to about 40,000 years before present based on terrace dating. Following his graduation, 16 mammoths were discovered. These first remains were protected with plaster jackets and stored at the Strecker Museum (now the Mayborn Museum Complex). The other remains were excavated between 1990 and 1997. These remains include a large male (bull), a female, two juveniles, and a western camel (Camelops hesternus) and are in situ.

Though the first bones at the site were discovered in 1978, the site remained closed to the public until the end of 2009. That year, a shelter was completed to protect the bones and allow the site to be viewed by the general public. The site, now run by the City of Waco, Baylor University, and the National Park Service, sits in a more than 100-acre area of wooded parkland along the Bosque River.

=== National monument ===
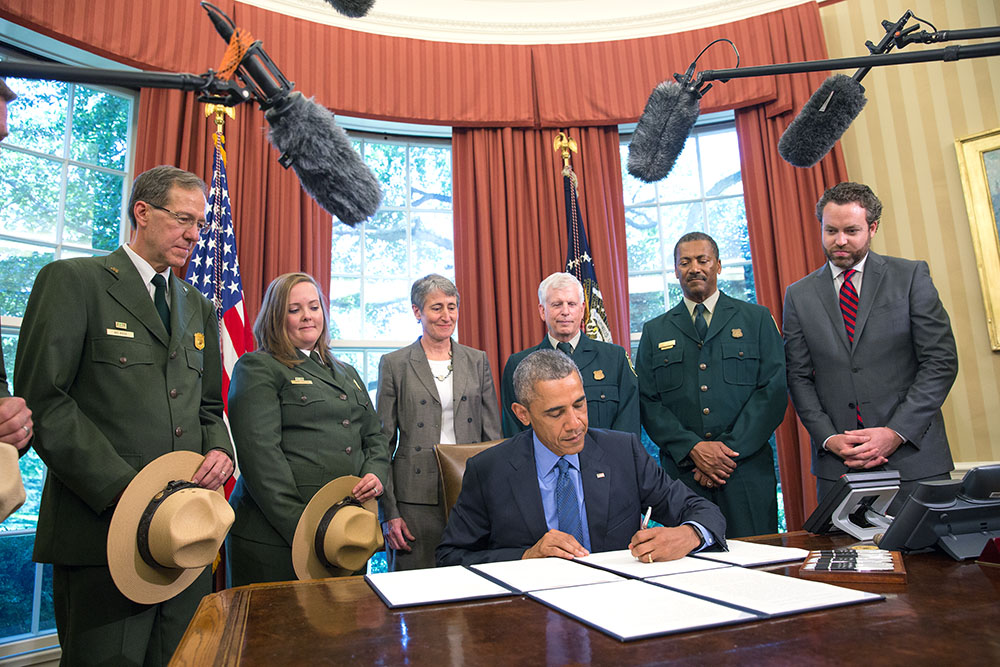
President Barack Obama signs national monument designations.

United States Representative Chet Edwards filed legislation in 2010 to make the site a national monument and include it as a unit of the National Park Service. The bill passed the House of Representatives, but died in the Senate. Representative Bill Flores filed a similar bill in 2012. Again, the bill passed the House, but died in the Senate.

On July 10, 2015, President Barack Obama used his authority under the Antiquities Act to designate the site as Waco Mammoth National Monument, to be managed by the National Park Service in collaboration with the City of Waco and Baylor University. Members of the National Park Service and United States Forest Service and Secretary of the Interior Sally Jewell surrounded President Obama as he signed the executive orders in the Oval Office. The city has deeded the 5-acre dig site to the federal government, but retains 100 acres around it for future park-related development.

== Features ==
=== Geography ===
The Waco Mammoth National Monument is found in Waco, Texas. The location of the monument lies on along the Bosque River, within 100 acres of wooded parkland. Due to the proximity to the river, the deaths of the uncovered prehistoric animals are thought to have been a result of flash flooding, drowning the creatures about 67,000 years ago. Land erosion further cemented the mammoths along with several other mammals of the time, into the depths of the earth.

=== Attractions ===
The Waco Mammoth National Monument is the site of the only known remains of a herd of Columbian mammoths. The site also includes in situ fossils of a camel, a bull mammoth, and female mammoths. The monument stands as one of the largest single-herd death sites in the world.

=== Youth involvement ===
The Waco Mammoth National Monument allows opportunities for youth to participate in field trips, group tours, and to become a "Junior Ranger" by completing activities throughout the park.

== See also ==
- List of national monuments of the United States
- Natural history museums in Texas
- Paleontology in Texas
- La Brea Tar Pits
- List of mammoths
- Mammoth central
- Niederweningen Mammoth Museum
- Pleistocene Park
- The Mammoth Site
