= Adams mammoth =

Wooly mammoth carcass

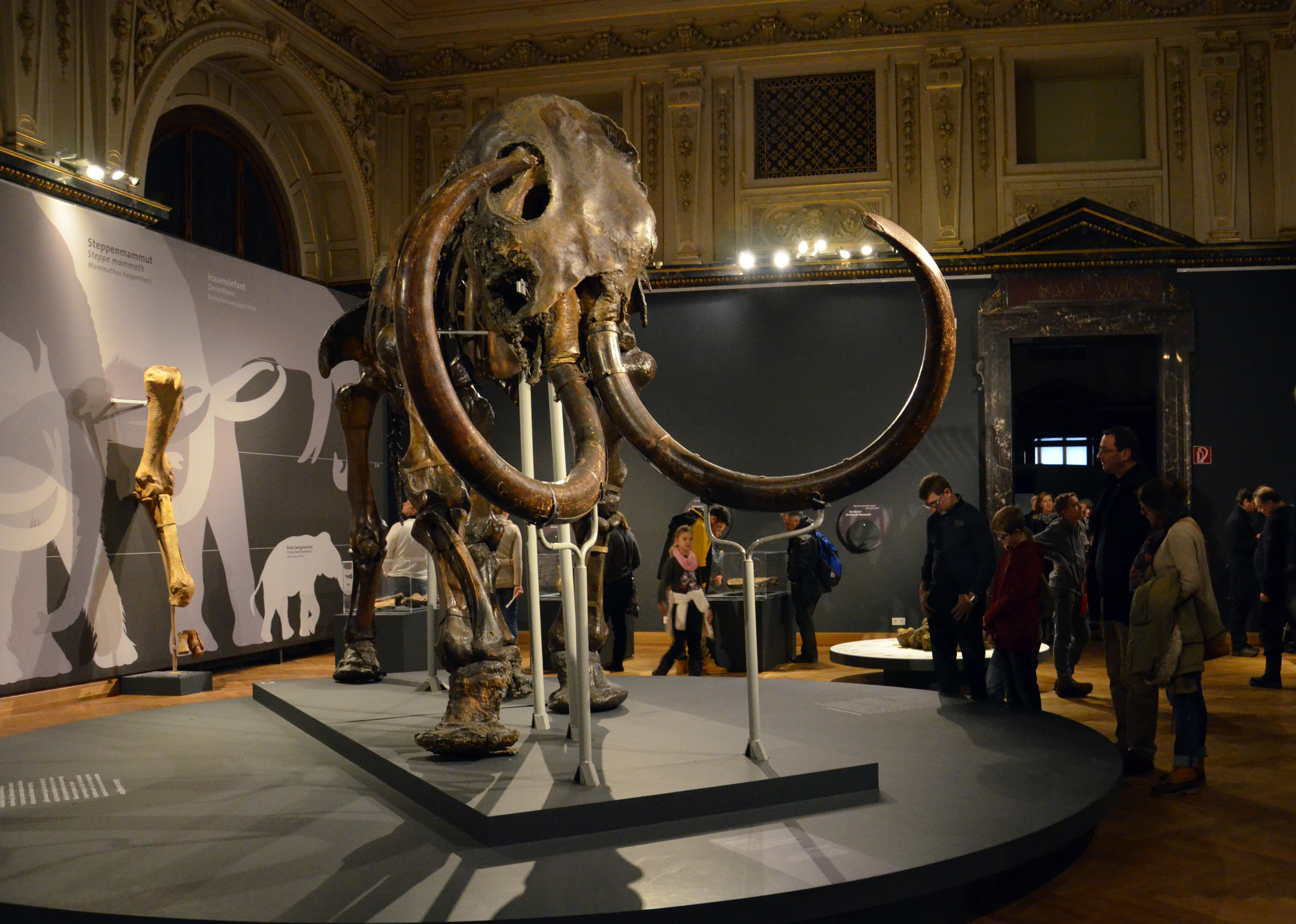
The "Adams mammoth" on exhibit in Vienna

The Adams mammoth, also known as the Lensky mammoth, is the first woolly mammoth skeleton with skin and flesh still attached to be recovered by scientists. The mostly complete skeleton and flesh were discovered in 1799 by Ossip Shumachov, an Evenki hunter, in Mys Bykov (near Bykovsky, Sakha Republic, Russia), a northeastern Arctic Siberian peninsula on the Lena river delta. The remains were subsequently recovered in 1806, when Russian botanist Mikhail Adams journeyed to the location and collected them.

== Discovery ==
The first published reports of Siberian mammoth remains appeared in Europe in the 1690s. In 1728, Sir Hans Sloane published what can be considered the first comprehensive scientific paper on mammoths in the Philosophical Transactions of the Royal Society. Sloane's paper was based on travellers' descriptions and a few scattered bones collected in Siberia and Britain. While he discussed the question of whether or not the mammoth was an elephant, he drew no conclusions. In 1738, Johann Philipp Breyne argued that mammoth fossils represented some kind of elephant, but could not explain why a tropical animal would be found in such a cold area as Siberia; he suggested that they might have been transported there by Noah's flood. Between 1692 and 1806, only four descriptions of frozen mammoths—skeletons with skin and flesh still attached—had been published in Europe. None of the remains of those five were recovered and no complete skeleton was recovered during that time. By the end of the century, based on this partial data, Georges Cuvier was able to argue conclusively that the Siberian mammoth was a different species than either of the two known species of elephant. This was the state of affairs when Adams heard about Shumachov's discovery.

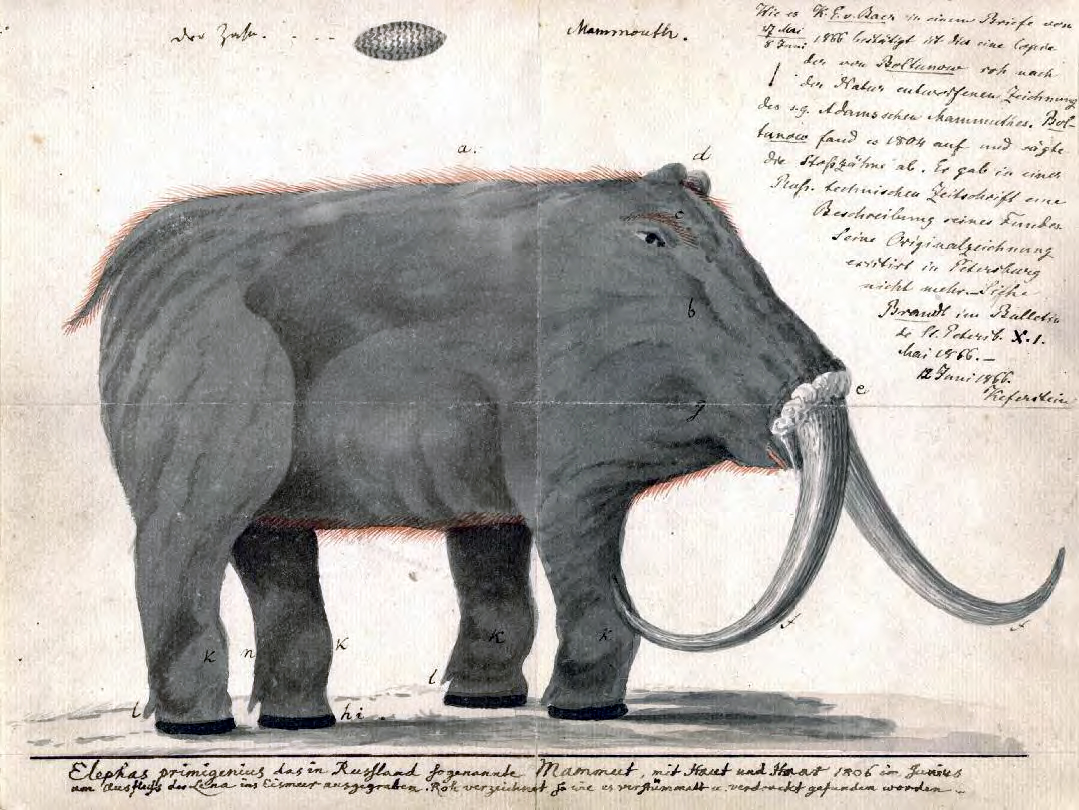
Early 19th century interpretation of the "Adams mammoth" carcass prior to excavation

Adams had come to Siberia in 1805 as part a scientific team attached to Count Yury Golovkin's unsuccessful diplomatic mission to China. After the failure of the mission, several members of the scientific team stayed on in Siberia to conduct research. While in Yakutsk at the beginning of the summer of 1806, Adams heard from an ivory merchant about the frozen mammoth discovered near the Lena Delta. He hired four Cossacks and sailed down the Lena to its delta on the Arctic Ocean. At the end of June, he arrived in Shumachov's village; at the end of July, Adams, Scumachov, and ten men from Shumachov's village journeyed to the mammoth's location.

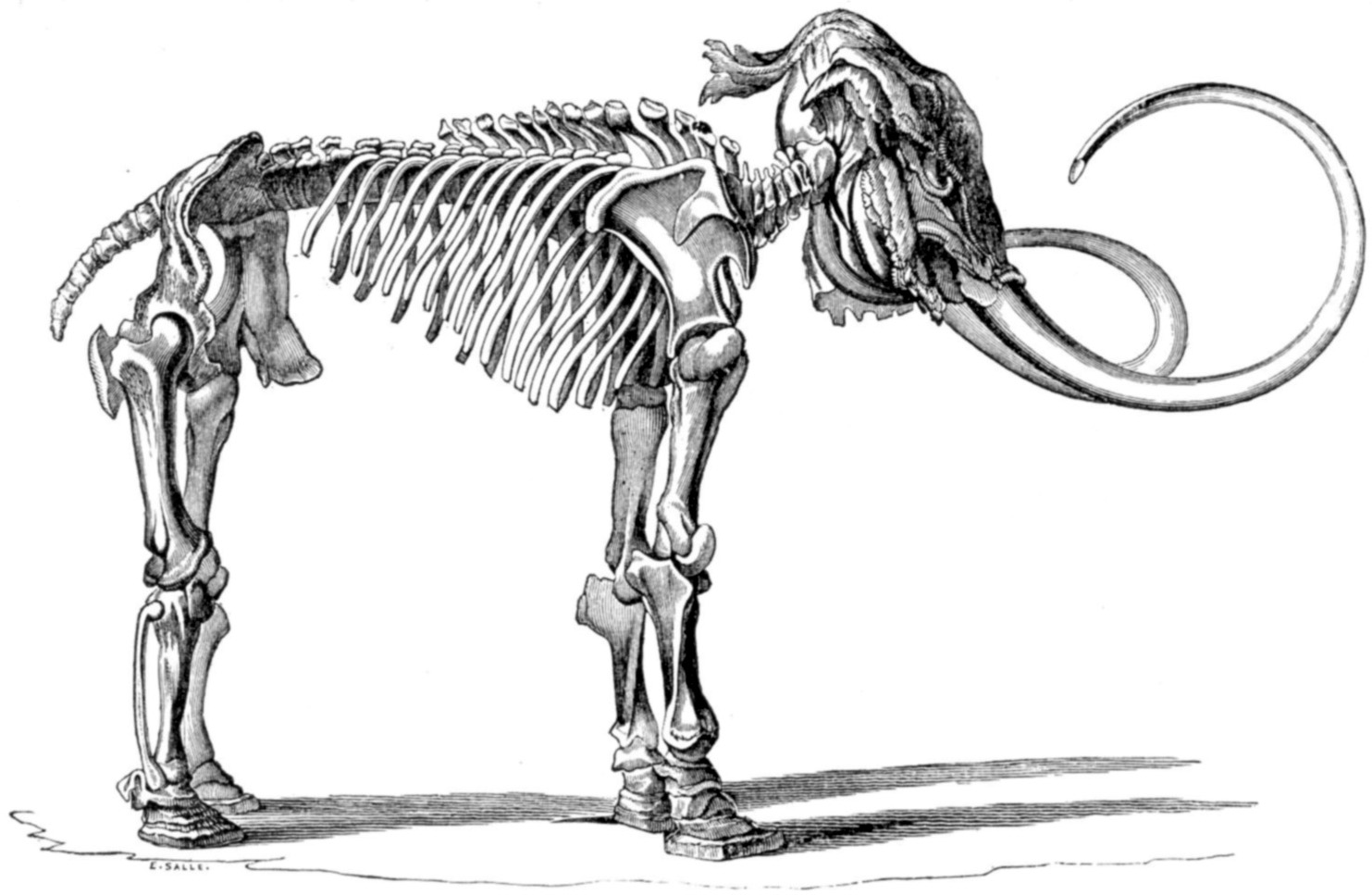
Wilhelm Gottlieb Tilesius' etching of the Adams mammoth skeleton now on display in the Museum of Zoology, Saint Petersburg.

At first, Adams was disappointed to discover that wild animals had eaten most of the organs and flesh of the mammoth (including the trunk). However, his disappointment lessened after examining the carcass and realizing that what was left would still be, by far, the most complete mammoth ever recovered. All in all, Adams recovered the entire skeleton, minus the tusks, which Shumachov had already sold, and one foreleg; most of the skin, which he described as "of such an extraordinary weight, that ten persons ... moved it with great difficulty"; and nearly forty pounds of hair. During his return voyage, he purchased a pair of tusks that he believed were the same ones that Shumachov had sold.

=== Reassembling the skeleton ===
In St. Petersburg, the task of reassembling the skeleton was given to Wilhelm Gottlieb Tilesius. Tilesius' task was made easier by the fact that the Kunstkamera, the museum established by Peter the Great, contained the skeleton of an Indian elephant that Tilesius was able to use as a reference. Tilesius had wooden replicas made to replace the missing leg bones. His reconstruction was one of the first attempts at reconstructing the skeleton of an extinct animal. While most of the reconstruction is correct, Tilesius made a glaring error by mounting the tusks on the wrong sides (so that they curved outward instead of inward). The error was not corrected until 1899 and the correct placement of mammoth's tusks would still be a matter of debate into the twentieth century.

=== Publication of findings ===
Adams' account of his journey was published in late 1807 and was soon translated into other European languages and circulated throughout Europe and the Americas. Tilesius made a set of etchings of his reconstruction and sent them other naturalists to examine while he worked on a detailed report of the skeleton, which was finally published in 1815.

== See also ==
- List of mammoths
- Jarkov Mammoth
- Lyuba Mammoth
- Sopkarga Mammoth (Zhenya)
- Yuka Mammoth
- Yukagir Mammoth
