= List of mammoth specimens =

This list covers mammoth remains which are either notable in their history or preservation. Mass accumulations of mammoth remains are included in the latter portion of this list.

== List of notable individual fossil or subfossil mammoth remains ==
Name	Image	Location of discovery	Date of discovery	Age of remains in radiocarbon years BP	Comments
Adams mammoth		Mouth of the Lena River, Siberia	1799	35,800	It is the first complete mammoth skeleton ever to be reconstructed. Originally, it was an entire mummified mammoth carcass.
Beresovka Mammoth		Berezovka River, Siberia	1900	44,000	Except for the head, it is an almost wholly preserved, mummified mammoth carcass.
Effie / Fairbanks Creek Mammoth		Fairbanks Creek near Fairbanks, Alaska	1947	21,300±1,300 (1948), >28,000 (1951), 31,400±2,040 (1965)	It consists of the mummified head, trunk, and left forelimb of a mammoth calf. Soaked in glycerine during collection. As a result, it required redating in 1951 and 1965.
Fishhook Mammoth		Shoreline banks of the estuary of the Upper Taimyra River, Taymyr Peninsula, Siberian Federal District.	1990-1992	20,620±70	Partial woolly mammoth carcass
Jarkov Mammoth		Taymyr Peninsula, Siberian Federal District	July 1997	20,000	Found by members of the Jarkov family, who are Dolgan reindeer herders.
Kirgilyakh (Magadan) Mammoth (Dima)		Northeast Siberia, near Kirgilyakh Creek in the Upper Kolyma basin	June 23, 1977	40,000	The discovery of the frozen carcass of the Kirgilyakh (Magadan) Mammoth or Dima provided the first opportunity for a detailed study of the anatomy of a mammoth calf.
Lyuba Mammoth		Near the Yuribei River on the Yamal Peninsula in northwest Siberia.	May 2007	42,000	Lyuba was formerly regarded as the most complete and best-preserved mammoth calf discovered, prior to the discovery of Yuka. It is nicknamed Lyuba after the diminutive of the name of the wife of the reindeer herder who discovered it.
Malolyakhovsky Mammoth (Buttercup)		Maly Lyakhovsky Island of the New Siberian Islands archipelago	2012	28,610±110	While many mammoths found in permafrost are dried up and mummified, “this was really juicy,” said Herridge, who likened the appearance of the muscle to a “piece of steak — bright red when you cut into the flesh and then as it hit the air, it would go brown.”
Yuka Mammoth		Oyagossky Yar coast, 30 km west from the mouth of the Kondratieva River near Yukagir, Siberia.	August 2010	34,300+260/−240	The Yuka mammoth corpse consists of about 95% of its hide, and soft tissues around limbs were preserved in articulated position. This male mammoth calf was nicknamed ‘Yuka’ after the village of Yukagir, whose local people discovered it. Initially misclassified as female, it was determined to be male by later RNA testing.
Sopkarga Mammoth (Zhenya)		Taymyr Peninsula, Siberian Federal District	August 28, 2012	43,350±240	The Sopkarga Mammoth (Zhenya) was found on the right bank of the Yenisei River about 3 km north of the Sopochnaya Karga Meteorological Station on Sopochnaya Karga Cape. Zhenya is the diminutive of the name of the 11-year-old boy who discovered it.
Khroma Mammoth		Allaikhovskii District, Yakutia, Khroma River	October 2008	greater than 45,000	Khroma is very well preserved excepting the absence of trunk.
Yukagir mammoth		Northern Yakutia, Arctic Siberia, Russia	2002 (autumn)	22,500 cal. BP	Notably well-preserved head, which revealed that woolly mammoths had temporal glands between the ear and the eye
Nun cho ga mammoth		Yukon, Trʼondëk Hwëchʼin First Nation, Canada	June 21, 2022	greater than 30,000.	Considered the most complete mummified mammoth found in North America, and only the second such find of a calf since Effie (1948). Also roughly same size as Lyuba (2007).

== List of significant fossil or subfossil mammoth bone accumulations ==
In the former Soviet Union and Russia, bone beds and other accumulations of fossil and subfossil bones are known in the scientific literature as mass accumulations.

Name	Image	Location of discovery	Date of discovery	Age of remains in years BP	Comments
Achchagyi–Allaikha mass accumulation		Achchagyi–Allaikha stream, Yana-Indighirka coastal lowlands, Siberia.	1987	12,490±80 to 12,400±60 BP., C14	The concentration of bones in the Achchagyi–Allaikha mass accumulation was likely result from the simultaneous deaths of a large number of animals within herd-family groups in one or several seasons. The formation of this mass accumulation is argued to be a direct consequence of short but strong climatic warming (Bølling oscillation) and associated unfavorable environmental conditions.
Berelyokh mass accumulation		Byoryolyokh River, Yana-Indighirka coastal lowlands, Siberia.	1947	12,720±100 to 11,900±50 BP., C14	The concentration of bones in the Berelyokh mass accumulation was likely result from the simultaneous deaths of a large number of animals within herd-family groups in one or several seasons. The formation of this mass accumulation is argued to be a direct consequence of short but strong climatic warming (Bølling oscillation) and associated unfavorable environmental conditions.
Condover site		Norton Farm Pit, Condover, south of Shrewsbury, United kingdom	1986	circa 12,300 BP., C14, Greenland Interstadial 1	Remains of several mammoths trapped in glacial kettle-hole
The Mammoth Site		Hot Springs, South Dakota	1974	Greater than 26,000 B.P, C14	As of 2016, the remains of 58 North American Columbian and 3 woolly mammoths have been found within pond sediments filling an ancient sinkhole.
Waco Mammoth National Monument		Waco, Texas	1978	66,800±5,000 BP, calendar	As of 2016, two bone beds have yielded 25 Columbian mammoths along with the remains of other co-existing fauna.
Mammoth central		Santa Lucía, Mexico	2020	10,000 to 20,000	As of 2020, at least 200 Columbian mammoths have been uncovered as well as 25 camels and five horses.

== See also ==
- Big Bone Lick State Park
- La Brea Tar Pits
- Niederweningen Mammoth Museum
- Pleistocene Park
