= Yukagir mammoth =

Woolly mammoth in Russia

Yukagir Mammoth
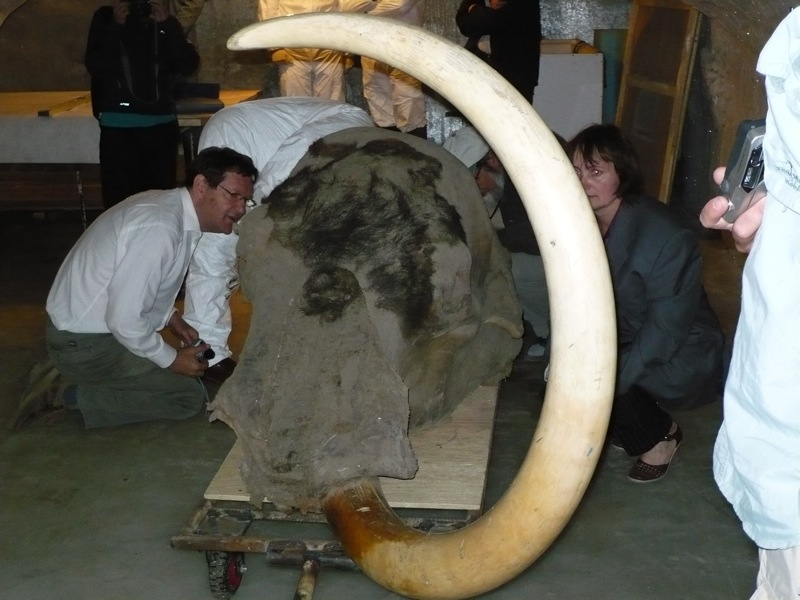
- The Yukagir Mammoth head
- Common name: Yukagir Mammoth
- Species: Woolly mammoth
- Age: c. 22,500 years
- Place discovered: Sakha, Russia
- Date discovered: 2002

The Yukagir Mammoth is a frozen adult male woolly mammoth specimen found in the autumn of 2002 in northern Yakutia, Arctic Siberia, Russia, and is considered to be an exceptional discovery. The nickname refers to the Siberian village near where it was found.

== Discovery ==
The head of this specimen, entirely covered with skin and very well-preserved, was first discovered in 2002. After hearing about the discovery, a polar explorer carried out the expedition with his team to extract the remains from the permafrost. One of the members of the team was the French polar explorer, "Mammoth-Hunter" Bernard Buigues, known for carrying out expeditions to the North Pole, Siberia since the 1990s. It took three excavation trips to gather and put the Yukagir fossil together. Although mammoth remains are not a rarity, few are as notable as this specimen.

The discovery of the Yukagir Mammoth, is described as one of the greatest paleontological discoveries of all time as it revealed that woolly mammoths had temporal glands between the ear and the eye and the well-preserved remains of the Yukagir Mammoth, such as the foot, shows that the soles of the feet contained many cracks that would have helped in gripping icy surfaces during locomotion. Like modern elephants, woolly mammoths were Paenungulata, meaning they walked on their toes and had large, fleshy pads behind the toes. Among other discoveries, the Yukagir Mammoth showed that the species had suffered from spondylitis in two vertebrae, and osteomyelitis which is also known from some other specimens. Several specimens have healed bone fractures, showing that the animals had survived these injuries.

The Yukagir mammoth's permafrost tomb preserved its head, tusks, front legs, and parts of its stomach and intestinal tract. From its bones and enormous tusks, the scientists who rushed to the site (including mammoth experts Dick Mol and Larry Agenbroad) guessed that the woolly mammoth was an old male that when alive stood over 2.72–2.83 m (8 ft 11 in – 9 ft 3 in) tall at the shoulder and weighed 4–5 t (8,800–11,000 lb). Furthermore, scientists were able to discover that the main component of the Yukagir's final meal was grass, including stems from the family Poaceae. Remarkably, like many of the dung's floral remains, the stems have retained their color and shape ever since the woolly mammoth tore them from the tundra roughly 22,500 years ago. Other studies estimate that the Yukagir mammoth reached a maximum shoulder height of 2.9 m (9 ft 6 in). Based on the Yukagir Mammoth's last meal, scientists were able to discover facts about the elephant's ancestors and conduct an environmental reconstruction showing fungi's importance in the process of nutrient cycling in the mammoth steppe.

The following types of research were agreed upon at the meeting of the Scientific Council:

- Geological and pedological surveys of the site, as well as research on the process of fossilization;
- Research on the external structures of the mammoth, as well as on the internal structures using nondamaging methods;
- Histological, cytological, and genetic research on the mammoth's soft tissue;
- Paleobotanical and paleoclimatologic analysis;
- Microbiological research on the soil and the inside of the mammoth.

== Exhibitions ==
Since the Yukagir Mammoth has been found, it has been transported globally for informative and educational purposes. To keep it preserved, the exhibition room needed to be kept at -15 °C.

== See also ==
- List of mammoths
- Adams’ Mammoth
- Jarkov Mammoth
- Lyuba Mammoth
- Sopkarga Mammoth (Zhenya)
- Yuka Mammoth
