= Yuka (mammoth) =

Mummified mammoth carcass

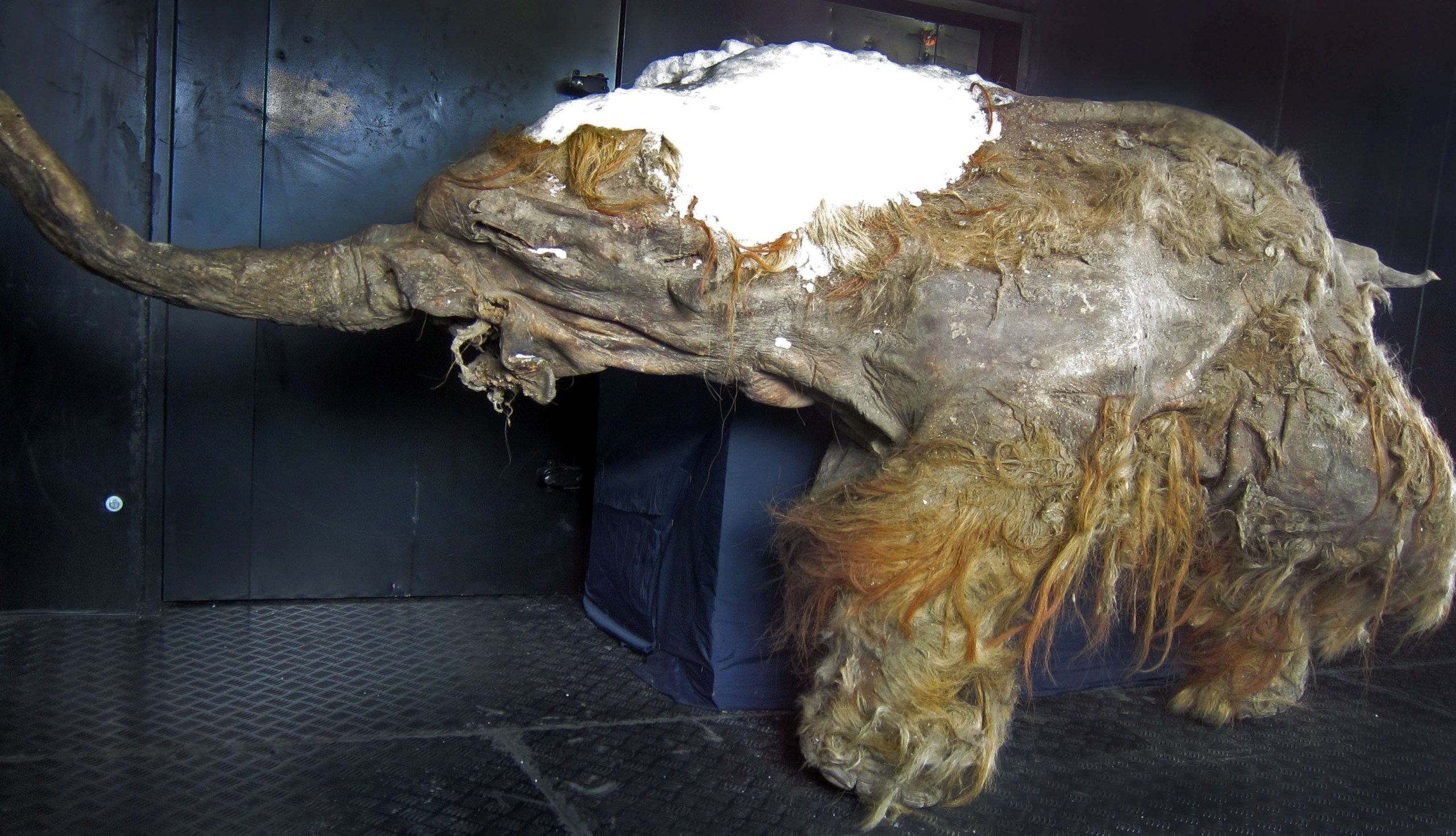
- Common name: Yuka
- Species: Woolly Mammoth
- Age: c. 39,000 years (aged c. 7)
- Place discovered: Sakha, Russia
- Date discovered: August 2010

External image
- Slideshow from Huffington Post
- Image from Discovery News

Yuka is the best-preserved woolly mammoth (Mammuthus primigenius) carcass ever found. It was discovered by local Siberian tusk hunters in August 2010. They turned it over to local scientists, who made an initial assessment of the carcass in 2012. It is displayed in Moscow.

== Discovery ==
The mammoth was found along the Oyogos Yar coast of the Dmitry Laptev Strait, approximately 30 kilometers (19 mi) west of the mouth of the Kondratievo River, Siberia (72° 40′ 49.44″ N, 142° 50′ 38.35″) in the region of the Laptev Sea. Yuka is a juvenile female natural mummy that was found near and named after the village of Yukagir, whose local people discovered it. This mammoth mummy was found on an overhanging ledge about 4 meters (13 ft) above the beach level in a low wave-cut bluff that was about 5 meters (16 ft) high.

The north-facing bluff was composed of loess that forms part of a rich Late Pleistocene fossil-bearing yedoma exposed by coastal erosion. The yedoma consists of ice-rich silts and silty sand penetrated by large ice wedges, resulting from sedimentation and syngenetic freezing. AMS-dating of a fragment of Yuka's rib from these deposits yielded a radiocarbon date of 34,300+260/−240 14C (GrA-53289). This date corresponds to the termination of Marine Isotope Stage 3, which is also called the Middle Weichselian, Kargin or Molotkov Interstadial.

== Research and analysis ==
After its discovery, Yuka spent two years stored and preserved in a natural refrigerator, the local permafrost ('lednik'), at Yukagir. At that time, a team led by Semyon Grigoriev from the Lazarev Mammoth Museum (North-Eastern Federal University, Yakutsk) arrived to study these mummified remains. By then, more than 100 meters (330 ft) of the low bluff had washed away. From Yukagir, the Yuka mammoth was transported to the Sakha Academy of Sciences in Yakutsk. Since October 2014, the mammoth has been on display in Moscow and is regarded as being the best preserved Siberian mammoth discovered thus far.

An analysis of the teeth and tusks determined Yuka to be around 6–8 years old when she died. Although it is presumed that this mammoth had most likely been attacked by lions or other predators, evidence that the predators had killed the mammoth was not found.

In March 2019, a Japanese research team led by Kazuo Yamagata, a biologist at Kindai University, worked with Yuka's tissue. Yamagata's team reported that they were able to stimulate nucleus-like structures to perform some biological processes. However, they could not activate cell division.

== See also ==
- List of mammoths
- Adams mammoth
- Jarkov Mammoth
- Lyuba Mammoth
- Sopkarga Mammoth
- Yukagir Mammoth
