= Byoryolyokh =

River in Yakutia, Russia

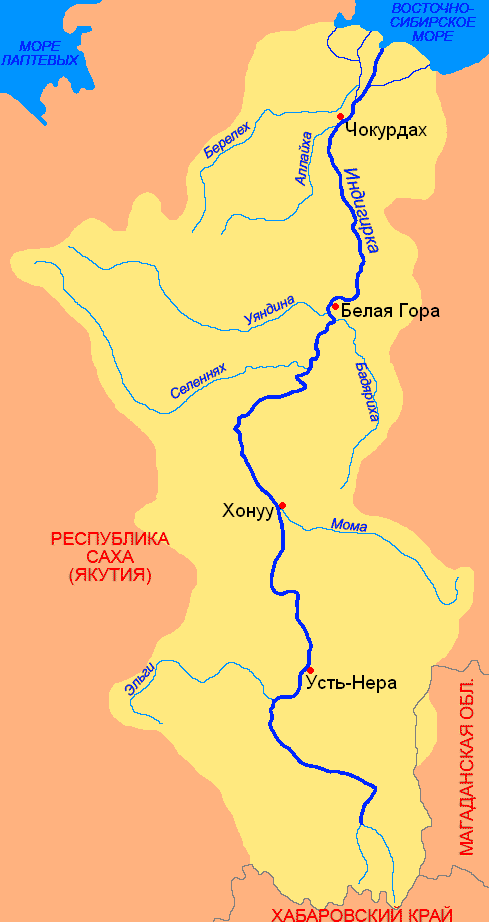
- Indigirka Basin

- Location in Sakha, Russia
- Native name: Бөрөлөөх (Yakut)

Location
- Country: Russia

Physical characteristics
- Source
  - location: Polousny Range
  - elevation: 160 metres (520 ft)
- Mouth: Indigirka
  - coordinates: 70°59′07″N 149°02′12″E
  - elevation: 1 metre (3 ft 3 in)
- Length: 754 km (469 mi)
- Basin size: 17,000 km^{2} (6,600 sq mi)

Basin features
- Progression: Indigirka→ East Siberian Sea

The Byoryolyokh (Russian: Бёрёлёх, Yakut: Бөрөлөөх, romanized: Börölööx) is a river in Yakutia in Russia. It flows into the Russko-Ustyinskaya, a left distributary of the Indigirka.

== History ==
By the Byoryolyokh, more than 8,000 bones from at least 140 woolly mammoths have been found in a single spot, apparently having been swept there by the current.

The northernmost archaeological site of the Paleolithic Stone Age is located by the river at 71°0′N 148°54′E.

== Etymology ==
The name of the river is based on the Yakut language Бөрөлөөх, Börölööx, meaning "teeming with wolves."

== Course ==
The source of the Byoryolyokh is located at the confluence of two small rivers north of the Polousny Range. The river flows roughly northeastwards across the Yana-Indigirka Lowland. The length of the Byoryolyokh is 754 kilometres (469 mi). The area of its drainage basin is 17,000 square kilometres (6,600 mi^{2}). The river is also known as "Yelon" (Russian: Елонь) in a section of its lower course. It joins the Indigirka from the left at the Russo-Ustinsky Canal, the western arm of the Indigirka River near its mouth, not far from Chokurdakh.

The main tributaries of the Byoryolyokh are the Wese-Killah on the left; and the Ulakhan-Killah (Tiit), Selgannah and Ary-May on the right.

There are more than nine thousand lakes in the basin of the Byoryolyokh River. It usually floods over its banks in July and August. In winter it freezes to the bottom.

== See also ==
- List of mammoth specimens
- List of northernmost items
- List of rivers of Russia
