= Wilhelm Gottlieb Tilesius von Tilenau =

German naturalist and explorer, physician, draftsman and engraver (1769-1857)

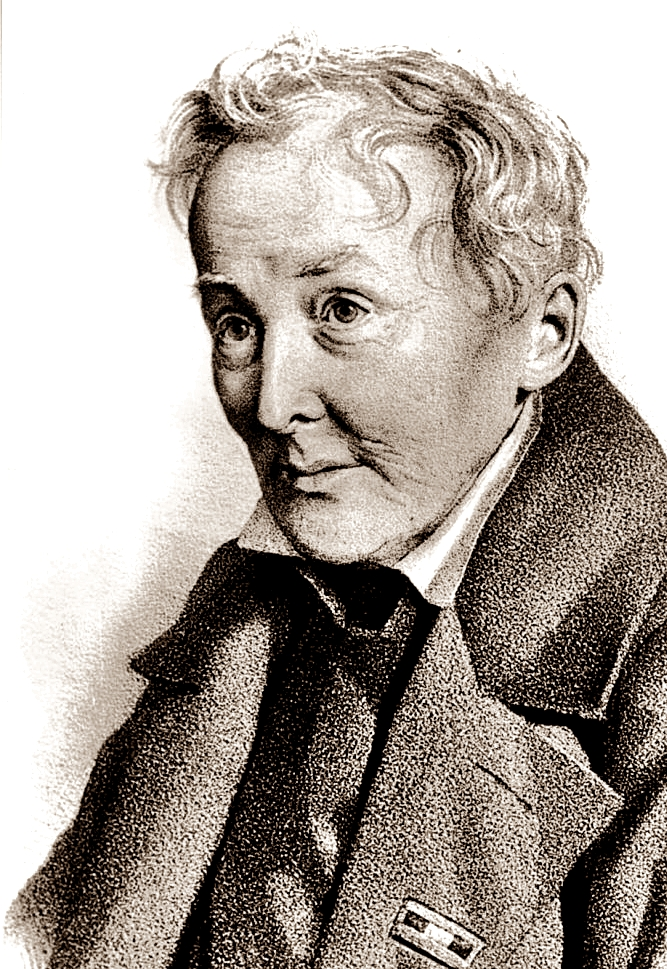
- W. G. Tilesius; drawing by Gustav Schlick, 1846
- Born: 17 July 1769; Mühlhausen (now in Thuringia)
- Died: 17 May 1857 (aged 87); Mühlhausen
- Known for: marine biology, dermatology
- Scientific career
- Fields: naturalist, physician, draftsman and engraver
- Author abbrev. (zoology): Tilesius

Wilhelm Gottlieb Tilesius von Tilenau (17 July 1769 – 17 May 1857) was a German naturalist and explorer, medical doctor, draftsman and engraver. He was a member of the Order of St. Vladimir and of the Legion of Honour.

== Early life and education ==
Wilhelm Gottlieb Tilesius was born in Mühlhausen (then part of the Holy Roman Empire) on 17 July 1769. His father was a merchant and actuary and his mother the daughter and sister of surgeons. It was his mother's brother who introduced the young Tilesius to the natural sciences and drawing. (Note: De Bersaques, 2011, p. 563)

In 1790 Tilesius began studies of natural sciences and medicine at the University of Leipzig, and at the same time took drawing lessons from Adam Friedrich Oeser at the art academy in the Pleissenburg. He completed his master's degree of arts in 1795, graduated as a doctor of philosophy in 1797, and in 1801 as a doctor of medicine. In 1795-96 he traveled with the earl and scientist Johann Centurius Hoffmannsegg by ship to Portugal. On this trip he studied marine animals, as well as the teaching and practice of medicine in Portugal. The results were published in several papers. (Note: De Bersaques, 2011, p. 564)

== Appointment in Moscow and role in Russian circumnavigation ==
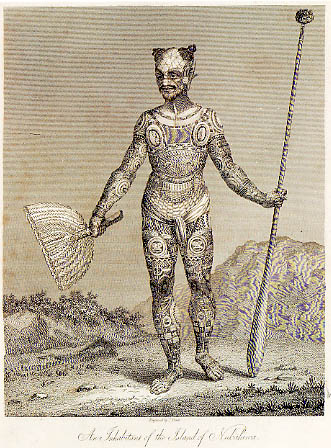
Tilesius's 1813 illustration, A warrior of Nuku Hiva with a spear and a hand fan (the expedition spent 12 days on Nuku Hiva (Note: De Bersaques, 2011, p. 568))

In 1803 he was appointed professor at Moscow University. He participated as a ship's doctor, marine biologist and expedition artist on the frigate Nadezhda in the first Russian circumnavigation of the globe during 1803-1806 under Adam Johann von Krusenstern. The Nadezhda departed from Kronstadt on the Baltic Sea, with Tlesius joining the expedition at Copenhagen; included among his baggage were a violin and viola, which he played on the voyage. (Note: De Bersaques, 2011, p. 568) The Nadezhda sailed past the Canary Islands and Brazil, around Cape Horn and across the Pacific Ocean to Japan, stopping at the Marquesas and Hawaiian islands, and also at Kamchatka. After visiting Japan, the Nadezhda set off towards Alaska, then sailed past China to the Indian Ocean, around Africa and back to the Baltic. Tilesius made numerous sketches and watercolors during the trip, particularly after the official artist departed in Japan. Honors Tilesius received on his return included being made a knight in the Order of St. Vladimir, corresponding membership of the Imperial Academy of Sciences, and a lifetime pension of 300 rubles per year. (Note: De Bersaques, 2011, p. 569) His illustrated report on the expedition appeared in 1814. However, he did not win public recognition like his contemporary, Alexander von Humboldt.

== Later life ==
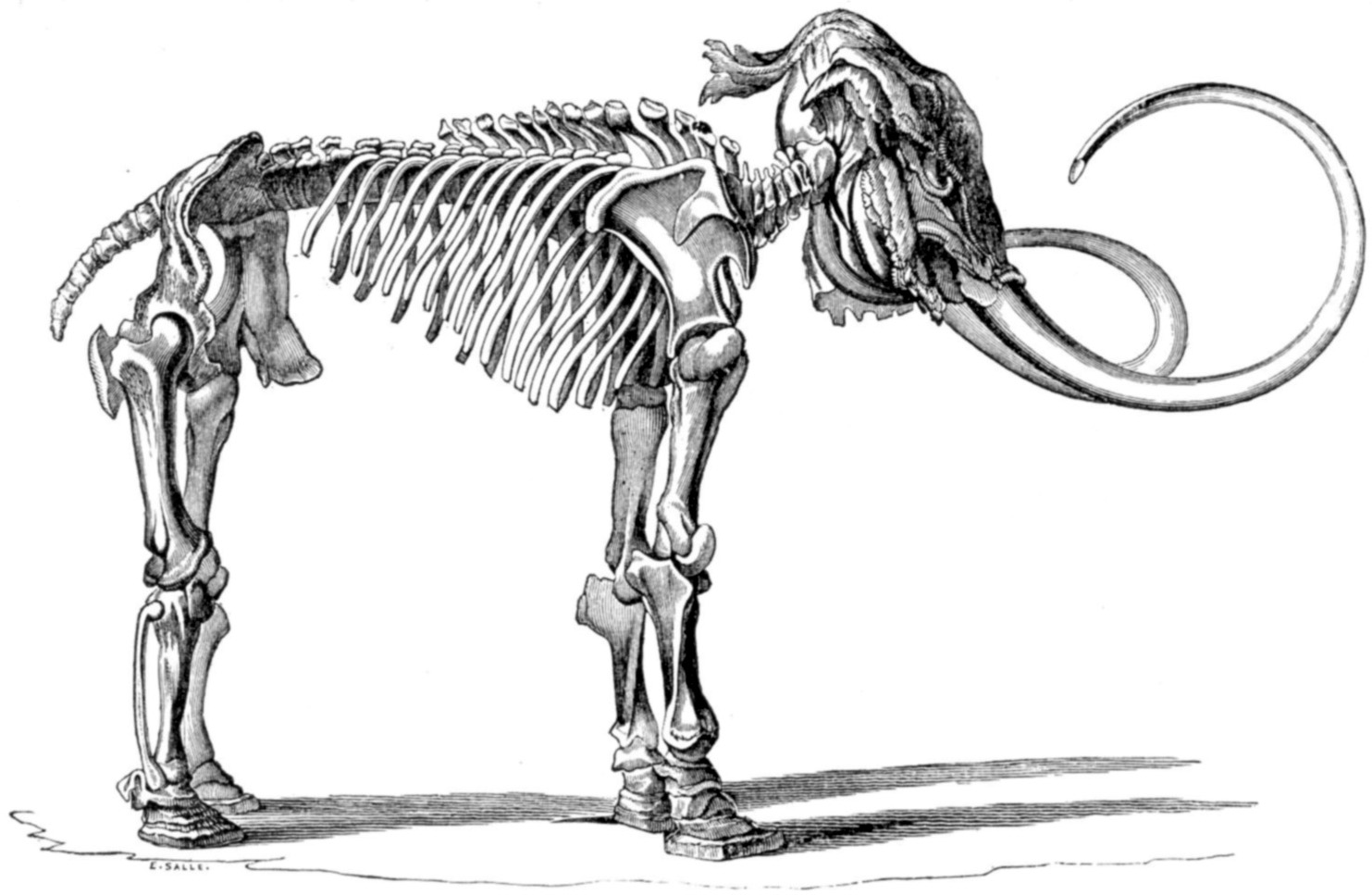
Tilesius's etching of the Adams mammoth skeleton now on display in the Museum of Zoology, Saint Petersburg.

On 12 May 1807 he married Olympia von Sitzky, 20 years his junior, daughter of a Polish nobleman. A son Adolf was born the following year, but they were separated in 1809. (Note: De Bersaques, 2011, p. 569)

One of his projects while in Russia was to reconstruct the skeleton of the Adams mammoth, a woolly mammoth whose nearly intact frozen carcass was excavated from the Siberian permafrost in 1806. (Note: De Bersaques, 2011, p. 569) This represented one of the earliest attempts to reconstruct the skeleton of an extinct animal. (Note: The first reconstruction, of Megatherium, was carried out by Juan-Bautista Bru de Ramón in 1795.) (Tilesius made one notable error in this effort, exchanging the tusks so that they diverged instead of converged.)

In 1814, Tilesius returned from Russia to his hometown of Mühlhausen and put his son in the care of his grandmother. He continued to lecture and publish on zoological, medical and ethnographic subjects, and attained membership in a number of scientific societies across Europe and in the United States, but did not obtain another academic position. (Note: De Bersaques, 2011, p. 569) He spent most of the rest of his life in Mühlhausen and Leipzig, and died in Mühlhausen (by then part of Prussia) in 1857.

== Selected publications ==
- 1799: "Addendum to the correction of individual views in the painting of Lisbon and individual fragments of an eyewitness to the knowledge of this capital city." In: [Joseph-François Barthélémy Carr], Latest paintings of Lisbon. With an appendix from the French by W. Tilesius. Leipzig, Karl Wilhelm Küchl (pp. 321–504).
- 1799: Johann Christian Rosenmüller / Tilesius William Gottlieb (ed.), Description of strange caves. A contribution to the physical history of the earth. Leipzig, Breitkopf and Haertel.
- 1800: Directory and classification of strange sea creatures
- 1800: "On the state of the art of dissection in Portugal." In: Johann Christian Rosenmüller / Henry F. Isenflamm (ed.), Contributions to the art of dissection. Volume 1, Issue 3, Leipzig, Tauchnitz (pp. 383–435).
- 1802: On the so-called sea mice [marine polychaete worms of genus Aphrodita]
- 1802: Year Book of Natural History for the display and evaluation of new discoveries and observations. Vol. 1, Leipzig, Karl Wilhelm Küchl.
- 1813: Fruits of the natural history of the first Russian circumnavigation of the Earth

== See also ==
- Category:Taxa named by Wilhelm Gottlieb Tilesius von Tilenau
