= Mammoth central =

Paleontological and archeological site in Mexico

Mammoth central (Spanish: Central de Mamuts) is a paleontological site on the grounds of the Santa Lucía Airport in the state of Mexico, Mexico which contains the remains of at least 500 Columbian mammoths as well as 200 camels and 70 horses. The site is the world's largest concentration of mammoth remains; the previous was The Mammoth Site in South Dakota with only 61 individuals. Human tools and carved bones have also been discovered at the site, suggesting that humans utilized the site to trap and kill large mammals. More fossils continue to be found at the site.

== History ==
The site is believed to have been the boggy shores of an ancient lake bed where animals were trapped and subsequently buried 100,000 to 20,000 years ago. Human tools have been found at the site. Some have hypothesized that humans drove the mammoths into the area to kill them. Archaeologist Rubén Manzanilla López, of the Instituto Nacional de Antropología e Historia, has also reported that the mammoths appeared to have been "carved up" by humans. It remains unclear whether the mammoths died of natural causes and were then carved by humans. The site is only 12 miles (19 km) from artificial pits which were once used by humans to trap and kills large mammals.

== Discovery ==
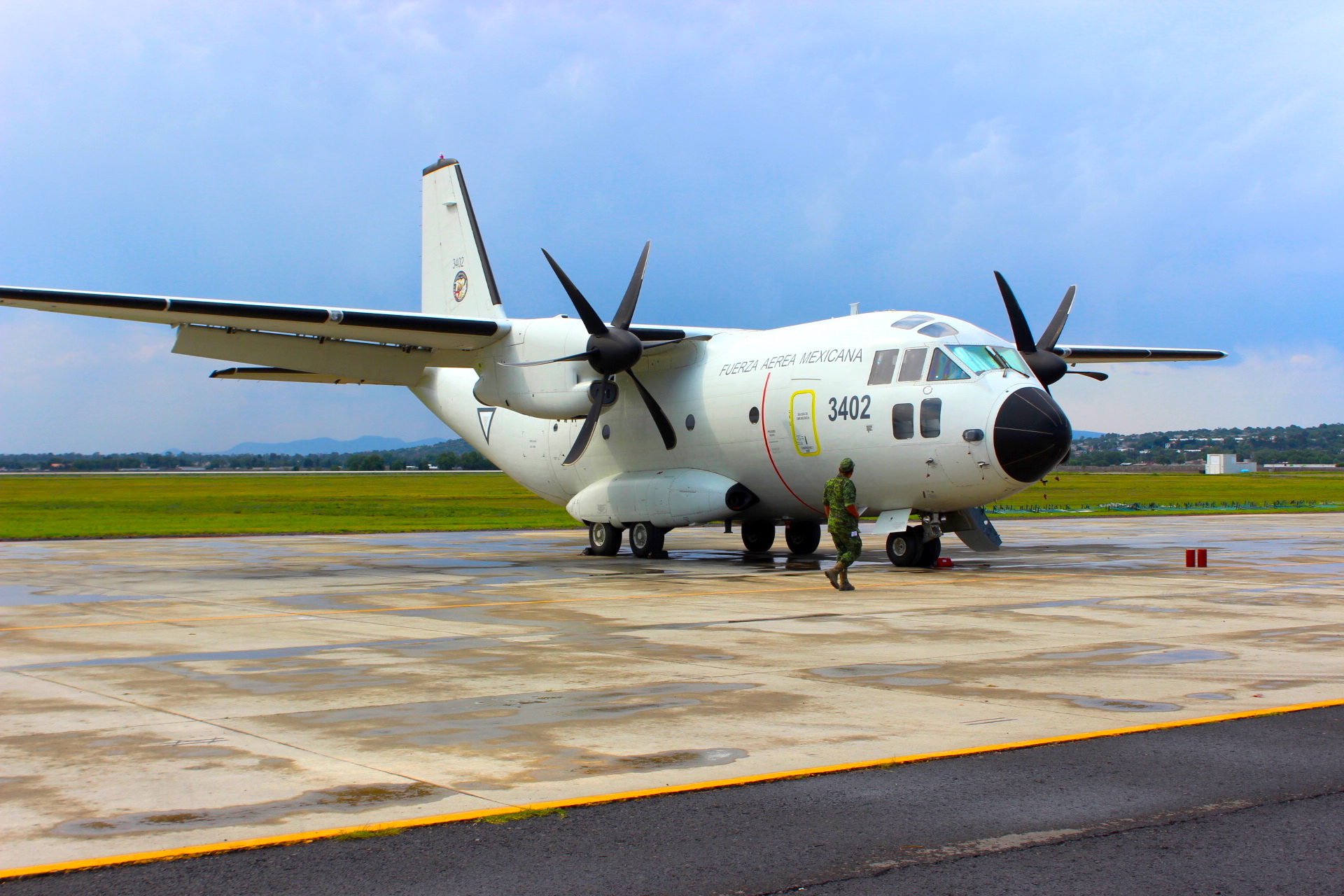
A military plane at the Santa Lucía Airport

The site was discovered during the construction of Mexico City Santa Lucía Airport in 2019. Due to the frequency of remains and artifacts, all bulldozers and construction workers are accompanied by archeologists. Construction was stopped multiple times for further excavations, and the airport was eventually completed in 2022.

== Significance ==
In studying the DNA of the mammoths found at Santa Lucía, a "deep genetic divergence" was discovered between the Mexican and northern populations of the Columbian Mammoth. This divergence likely began around 416,000 to 307,000 years ago, and after the split the groups remained almost completely separate from one another. Some researchers suggest that the Mexican mammoth should be distinguished in some capacity from the Columbian mammoth.

Researchers hope that the site will reveal the main causes of the extinction of the Columbian mammoth. Paleontologist Joaquin Arroyo Cabrales believes that the site will reveal that there was a "synergy effect between climate change and human presence."

== See also ==
- La Brea Tar Pits
- List of mammoth specimens
- Waco Mammoth National Monument
