= The Mammoth Site =

Paleontological site near Hot Springs, South Dakota

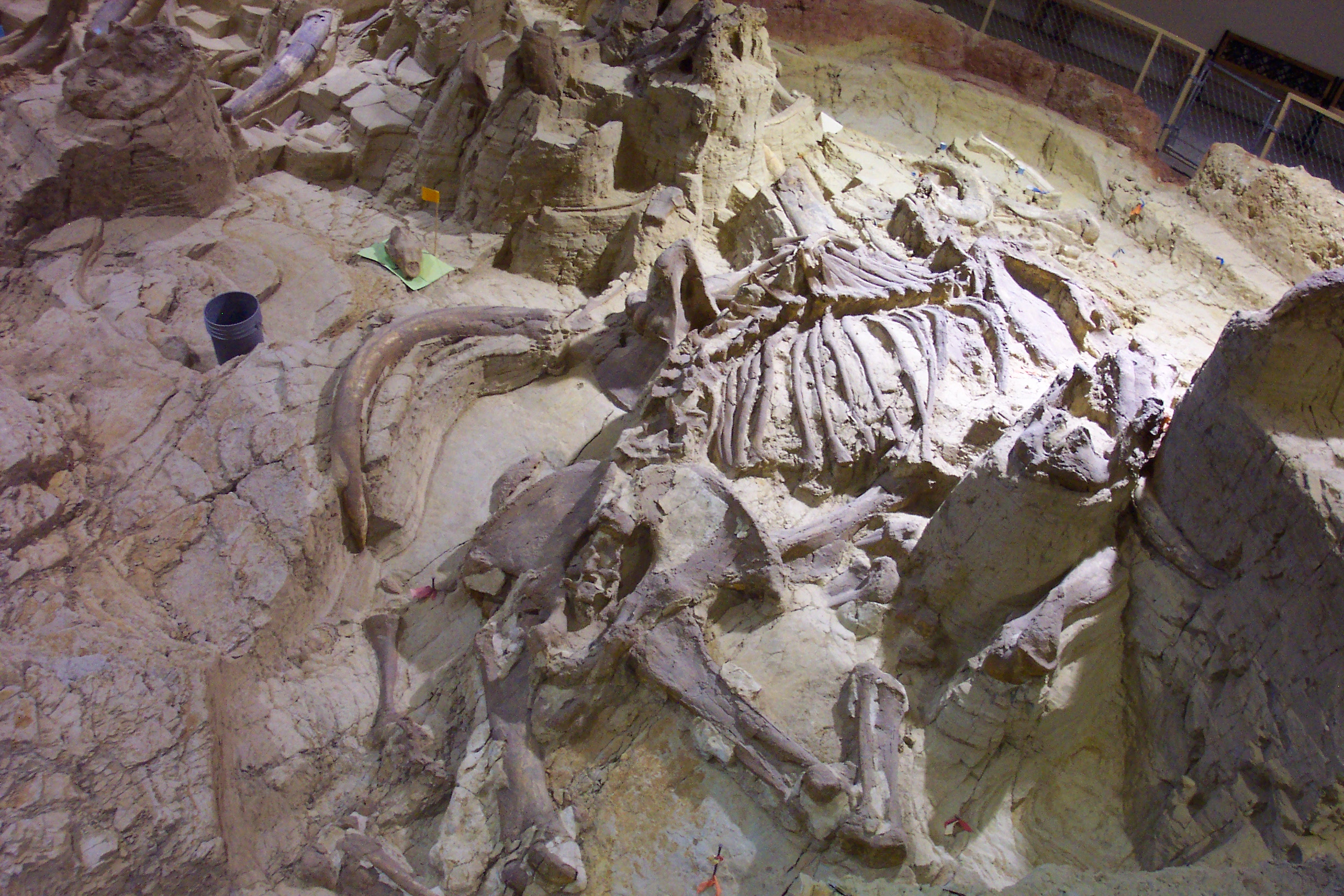

- Location within South Dakota Location within the United States
- Location: Hot Springs, South Dakota
- Coordinates: 43°25′29″N 103°28′59″W
- Designated: 1980
- Website: Official website

The Mammoth Site is a museum and paleontological site near Hot Springs, South Dakota, in the Black Hills. It is an active paleontological excavation site at which research and excavations are continuing. The facility encloses a prehistoric sinkhole that formed and was slowly filled with sediments during the Pleistocene era. The sedimentary fill of the sinkhole contains the remains of Pleistocene fauna and flora preserved by entrapment and burial within a sinkhole. As of 2016, the remains of 61 mammoths, including 58 Columbian mammoths and 3 woolly mammoths had been recovered. Mammoth bones were found at the site in 1974, and a museum and building enclosing the site were established. The museum now contains an extensive collection of mammoth remains.

== Formation ==
During the Pleistocene, the sinkhole at Mammoth Site of Hot Springs formed when a cavern in the Minnelusa Limestone collapsed. This cavern collapse created a steep-sided sinkhole, that was at least 65 feet (20 m) deep and 120 feet (37 m) by 150 feet (46 m) wide at the surface within a Pleistocene terrace underlain by Spearfish Shale. The sinkhole is the surface expression of a vertical breccia pipe which provided a chimney-like path that allowed warm artesian water to percolate upward and fill the sinkhole with a steeply-sided pond.

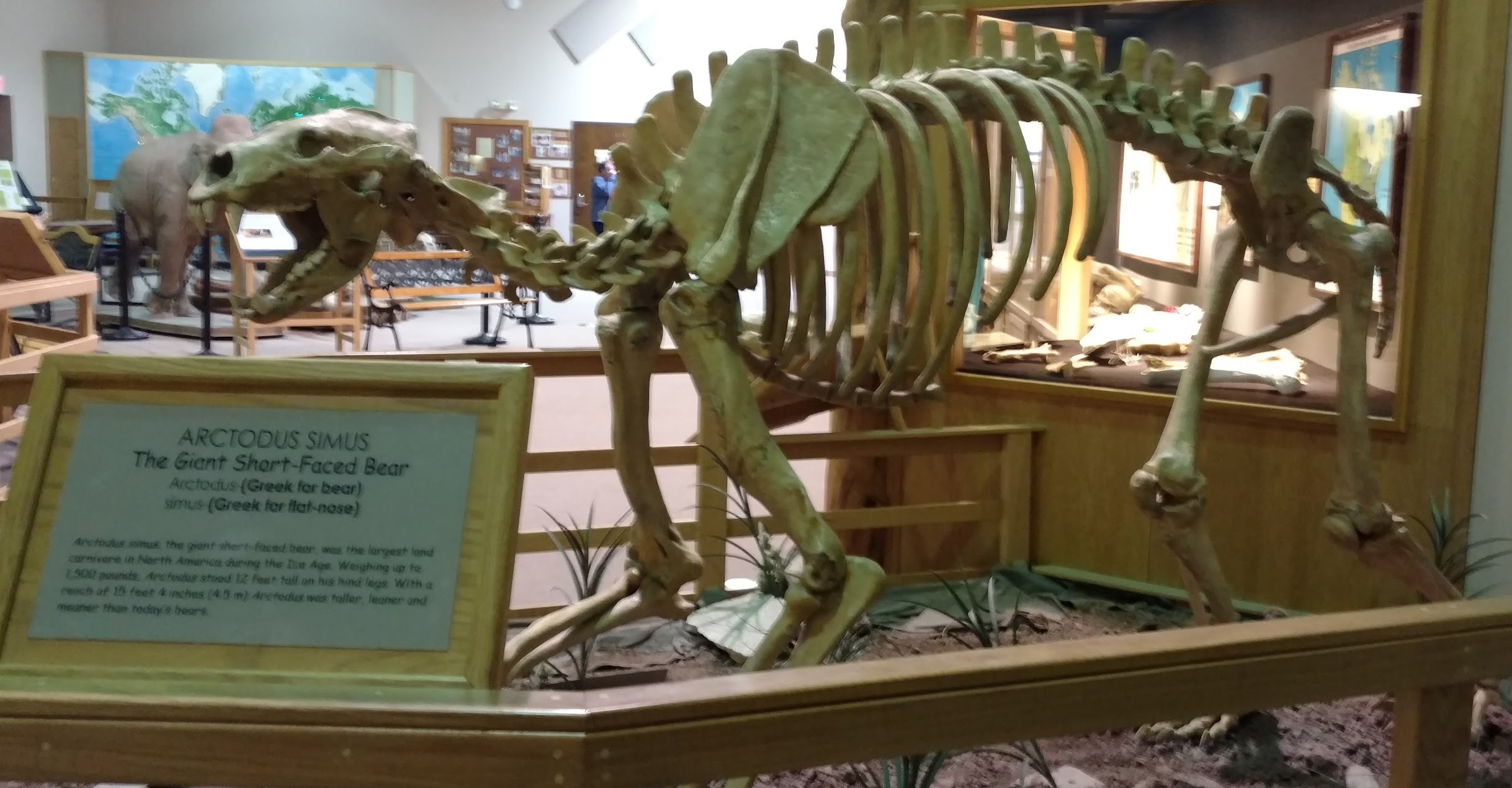
The bones of an Arctodus simus. Taken at Mammoth Site, Hot Springs, South Dakota

Based on observations from modern ponds and lakes, it is estimated that this pond slowly infilled with silt over a period of 350–700 years. The presence of worm burrows and mammoth footprints found throughout these sediments, demonstrate that the laminated sediments within this sinkhole accumulated slowly and contemporaneously along with the mammoth remains over a long period of time.

Likely enticed by warm water and pond vegetation, mammoths entered the pond to eat, drink or bathe. Because of the steep sides of very slippery Spearfish Shale, mammoths were occasionally trapped as they were unable to find a foothold and climb out of the sinkhole during periods of low water. Trapped in the sinkhole, the mammoths ultimately died of starvation, exhaustion, or drowned in the pond.

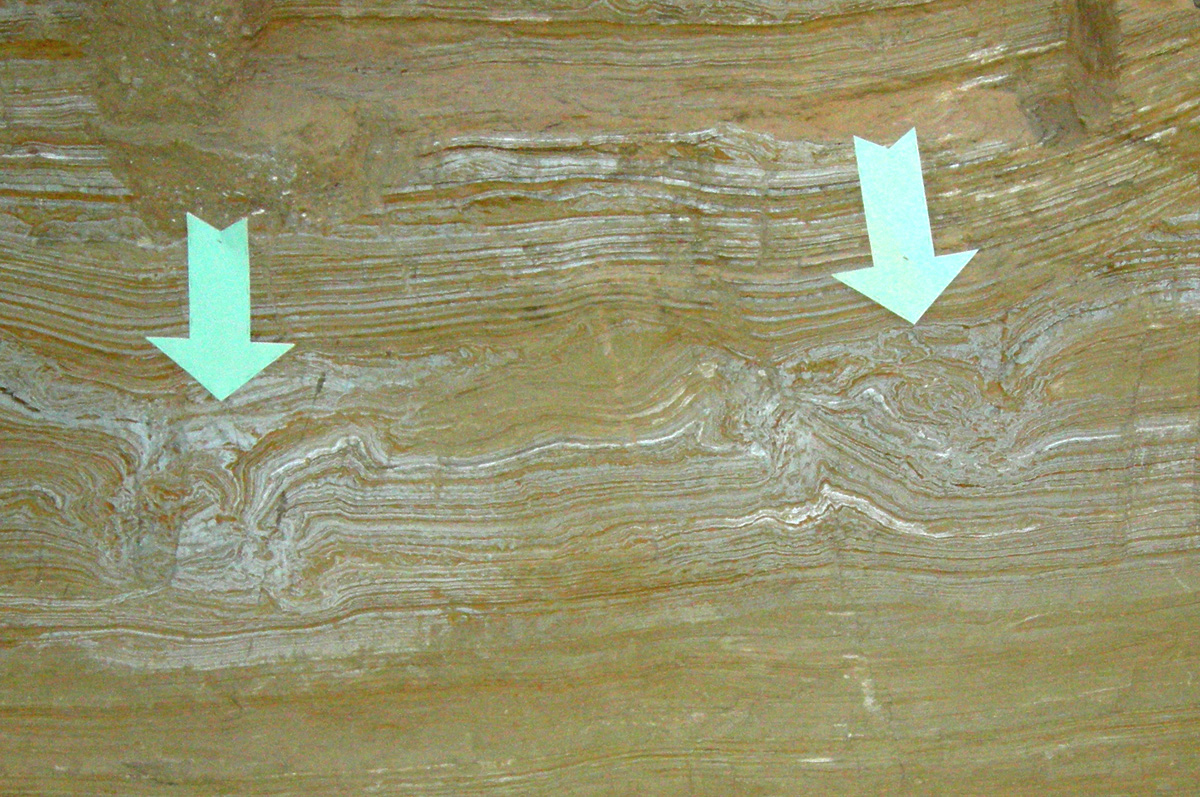
Cross-section of mammoth footprints at the Mammoth Site

Eventually the sinkhole filled, and the artesian spring diverted to the lower elevation of Fall River, as the river cut deeper in the valley floor. Over thousands of years, the "hardened mud plug" inside the dried-up pond has remained stable. The surrounding sediment was subsequently eroded, leaving the sinkhole as a high point on the landscape.

== Paleontology ==
Warm artesian-fed spring waters created a pond that was attractive to wildlife. Findings at the site include the remains of megafauna such as giant short-faced bears along with those of shrub oxen, American camel, llama, wolves, coyotes, birds, minks, ferrets, prairie dogs, voles, and moles. Invertebrate discoveries include several species of clams, snails, and slugs.

The majority of the mammoth remains have been identified as those of Columbian mammoths, although the remains of three woolly mammoths have been found as well. Mammoths that slipped into the sinkhole found it difficult to escape. Researchers measuring the pelvic bones of the remains have determined that most of the victims were young males.

A hypothesis drawn from observations of modern elephants' matriarchal societies, in which these group members are expelled, concludes that this group was inclined to the risk-taking behavior that led to their entrapment.

== Chronology ==
Initially, The Mammoth Site was estimated to be about 20,000 years old. This estimate was made on the basis of the faunal remains that are found in association with the mammoth remains. The presence of the remains of Pleistocene bear, camel, antelope, and shrub-ox indicated to geologists and paleontologists that sinkhole at this site might be filled with Late Pleistocene, possibly terminal Pleistocene, sediments.

Numerous attempts have been made to radiocarbon date these sediments. Initially, several attempts were made to radiocarbon date collagen from scrap mammoth bone recovered from the site. All of these attempts failed to recover sufficient collagen from the bone samples to allow dating of this fraction. Later, samples of the bone apatite (hydroxyapatite) fraction from mammoth bones were radiocarbon dated. Two samples of the heat treated apatite fraction yielded radiocarbon dates of 19,260±1520 B.P and 20,770±350 B.P. Samples of bone apatite, which were not heat treated, yielded radiocarbon dates of 21,000±700, 25,640±320, and 26,075+975/-790 B.P. A single sample of bone carbonate was radiocarbon dated at 36,960±1170 B.P. The circa 26,000 B.P. time frame has been widely used by researchers as the approximate the time that sediments and mammoths bones accumulated within the sinkhole within The Mammoth Site. However, radiocarbon dates derived from bone apatite are now known to be highly unreliable and at best represent the minimum age of the bone dated

Because of the limitations of radiocarbon dates derived from bone apatite, a tooth plate from a mammoth was dated and uranium series dating and sediments enclosing the mammoth bones were dated using thermoluminescence (TL) and optically stimulated luminescence (OSL). The tooth plate yielded a uranium series date of 128,966 B.P. The results of the TL dating were apparently never published and preliminary OSL ages indicate that the sinkhole and its associated sediments and mammoth bones are indeed older than 26 ka.

A 2026 study estimated based on feldspar-based luminescence dating that the site formed around 232-160,000 years ago in the late Middle Pleistocene, during Marine Isotope Stages (MIS) 7 and 6.

== Museum ==
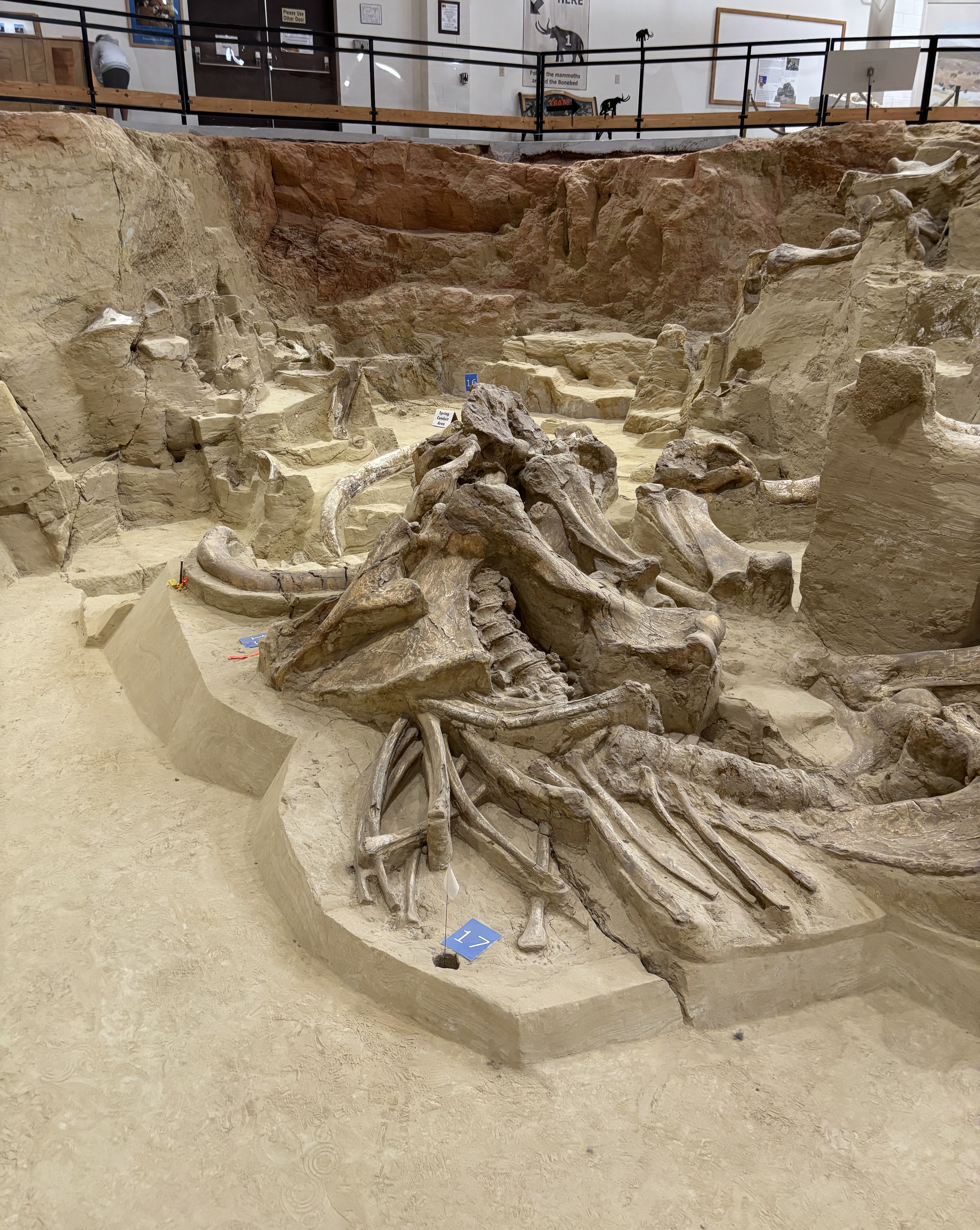
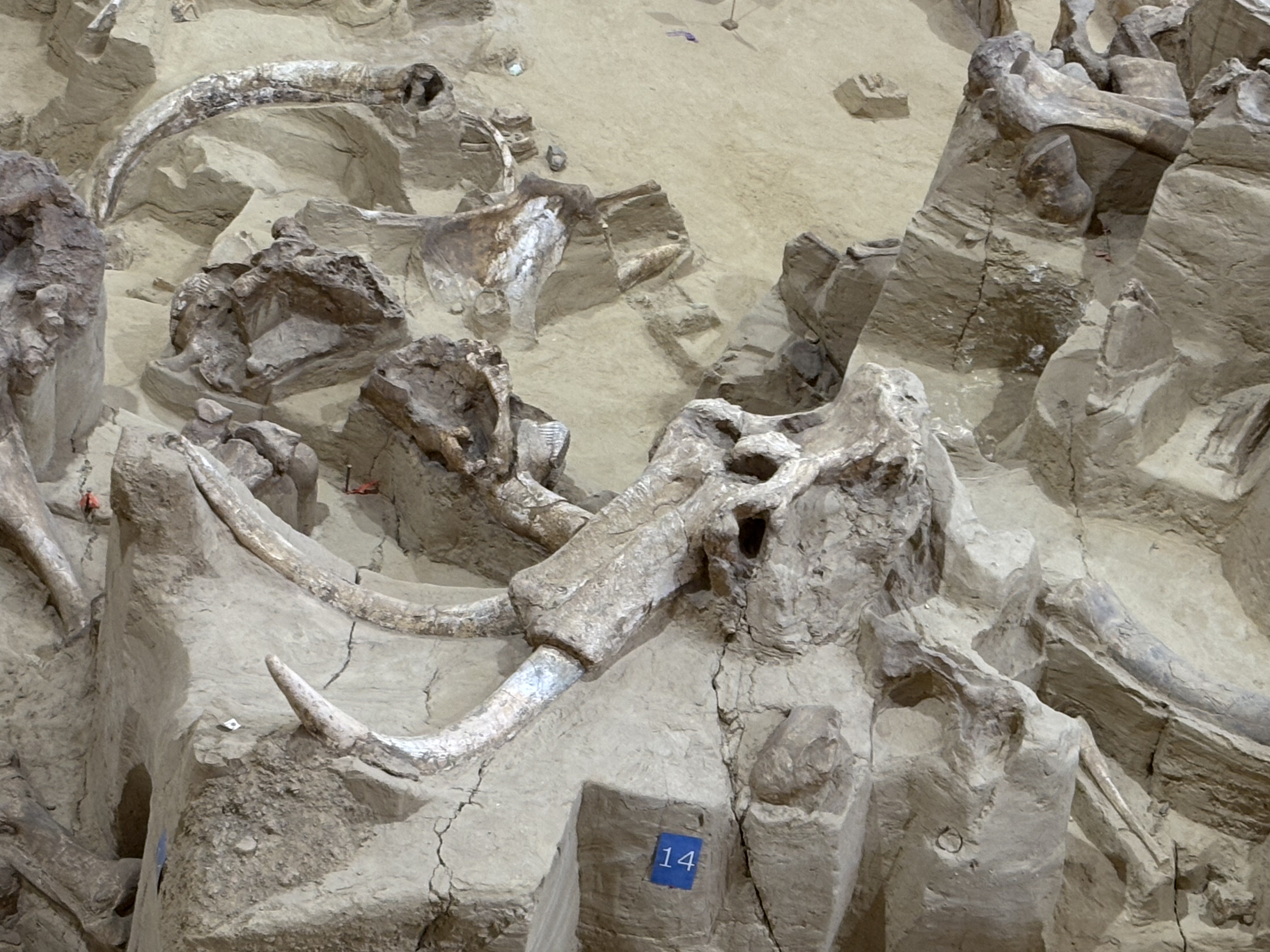
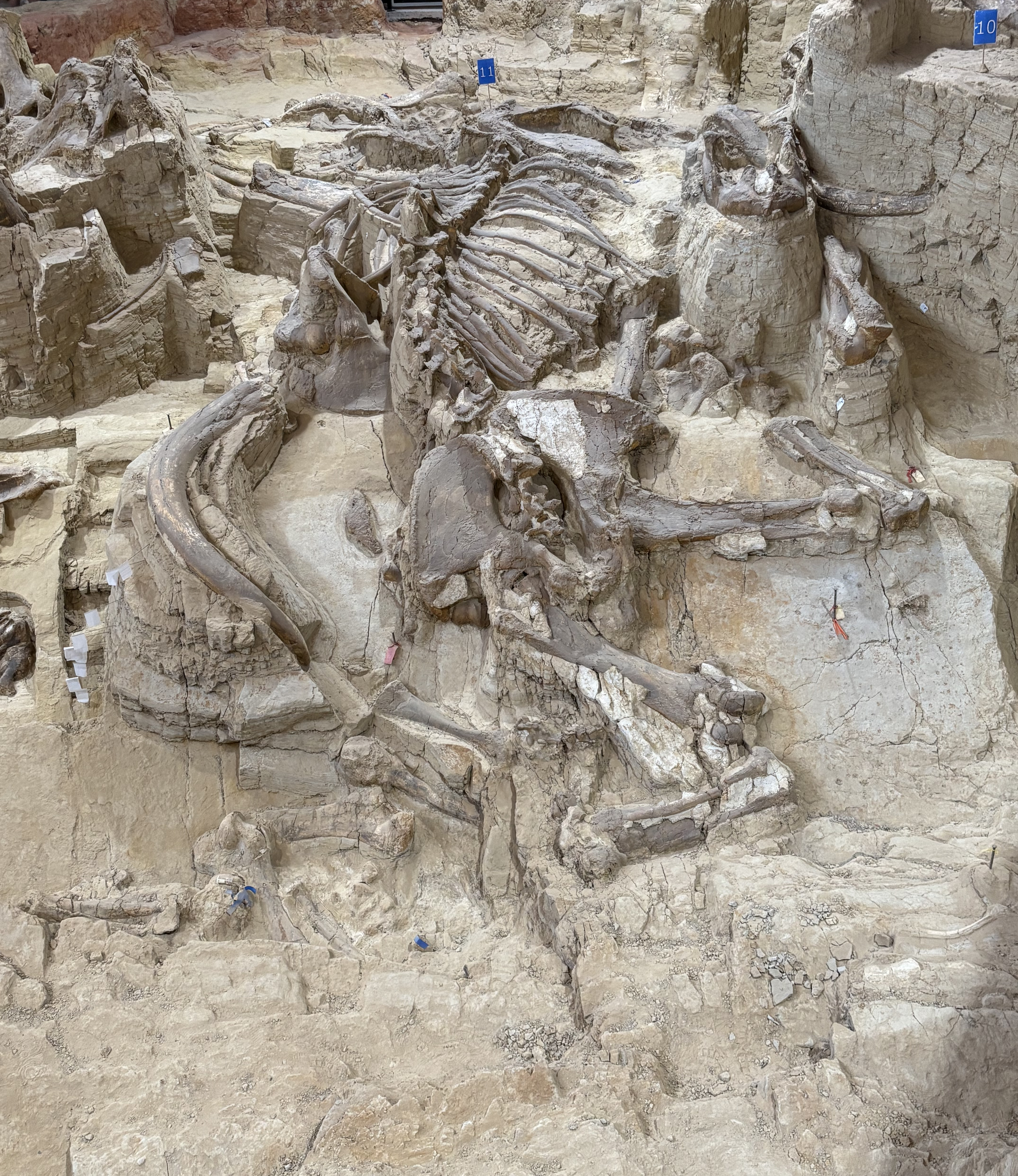
Photos showing various areas of well preserved Columbia Mammoth samples in the Mammoth Site dig pits.

In 1974, a construction worker, George Hanson, unearthed unusual bones while the area was being prepared for a new subdivision. His son recognized one of the finds as a mammoth tooth.

The landowner Phil Anderson agreed to further investigation, and a complete skull and tusk were found in 1974. Phil Anderson agreed to donate the entire bone bed and mineral rights to the nonprofit organization and along with the work performed by amateur and professional excavators, led to its status as a museum, and it was designated a National Natural Landmark in 1980. Initially the finds were mapped on a string grid; since then the mapping systems have increasingly relied on computerized technologies.

The Mammoth Site is a 501(c)-3 non-profit organization. The museum is open to the public. Earthwatch volunteers participate in excavations during July. The museum's visiting scientists have included specialists from Mexico, Italy, Netherlands, Great Britain, Russia, and Germany. The museum also houses a collection of Clovis and Folsom artifacts. and sponsors outreach programs for students from elementary to graduate-school levels.

== See also ==
- La Brea Tar Pits
- List of mammoths
- Mammoth central
- Niederweningen Mammoth Museum
- Pleistocene Park
- Waco Mammoth National Monument
