= Lyuba (mammoth) =

Female woolly mammoth calf

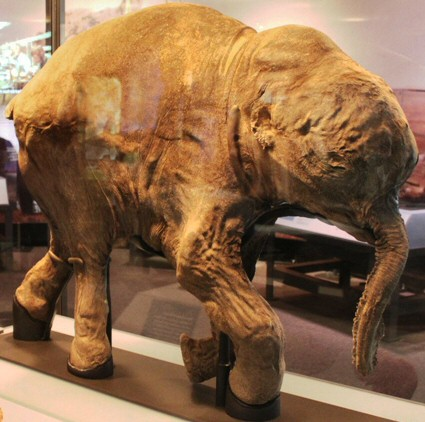
- Common name: Lyuba
- Species: Woolly Mammoth
- Age: c. 42,000 years (aged c. 1 month)
- Place discovered: Yamalo-Nenets, Russia
- Date discovered: May 2007
- Discovered by: Yuri Khudi

Lyuba (Russian: Люба) is a female woolly mammoth calf (Mammuthus primigenius) who died c. 42,000 years ago at the age of 30 to 35 days. She was formerly the best preserved mammoth mummy in the world (the distinction is now held by Yuka), surpassing Dima, a male mammoth calf mummy which had previously been the best known specimen.

== Discovery ==
Lyuba was discovered in May 2007 by Nenets reindeer breeder and hunter Yuri Khudi and his three sons, in Russia's Arctic Yamal Peninsula. Khudi recognized that Lyuba was a mammoth carcass and that it was an important find, but refused to touch the carcass because Nenets beliefs associated touching mammoth remains with bad omens.

Khudi travelled to a small town 150 miles away to consult his friend, Kirill Serotetto, on how to proceed. They notified the local museum director about the find, who arranged for the authorities to fly Serotetto and Khudi back to the location of the find on the Yuribey river. However, they found that Lyuba's remains had disappeared. Suspecting that profiteers may have taken the mammoth, Khudi and Serotetto drove on a snowmobile to a nearby settlement, Novy Port.

There they discovered Lyuba's carcass exhibited outside a local store. It turned out that the store owner bought the body from Khudi's cousin, who removed the body from its original location, in exchange for two snowmobiles. Lyuba's body suffered minor damage in the process, with dogs having chewed off her right ear and a part of her tail, but she remained largely intact. With the help of the police, Khudi and Serotetto reclaimed the body and had it transported by helicopter to the Shemanovsky Museum in Salekhard. In gratitude for Khudi's role, the museum officials named the mammoth calf "Lyuba", a diminutive form of the name Lyubov' (Любовь, meaning "Love"), after the first name of Khudi's wife.

== Subsequent study ==
The mummified calf weighed 50 kg (110 lb), was 85 centimeters (33.5 in.) high and measured 130 centimeters (51 in.) from trunk to tail, roughly the same size as a large dog. Studies of her teeth indicate she was born in the spring following a gestation similar in length to that of a modern elephant.

Lyuba (Russia)

At the time of discovery, the calf was remarkably well-preserved; her eyes and trunk were intact and some fur remained on her body. Lyuba's organs and skin are in perfect condition. The mammoth was transferred to Jikei University School of Medicine in Japan for further study, including computer tomography scans. Additional scans were conducted at the GE Healthcare Institute in Waukesha, Wisconsin and at the Nondestructive Evaluation Laboratory of Ford Motor Company in Livonia, Michigan. Lyuba is believed to have suffocated by inhaling mud as she struggled while bogged down in deep mud in the bed of a river which her herd was crossing.

Following death, her body may have been colonized by lactic acid-producing bacteria, which "pickled" her, preserving the mammoth in a nearly pristine state. Her skin and organs are intact, and scientists were able to identify milk from her mother in her stomach, and fecal matter in her intestine. The fecal matter may have been eaten by Lyuba to promote the development of the intestinal microbial assemblage necessary for the digestion of vegetation. Lyuba appears to have been healthy at the time of her death. By examining Lyuba's teeth, researchers hope to gain insight into what caused Ice Age mammals, including the mammoths, to become extinct 4,500–4,000 years ago. CT scans taken of Lyuba have provided new information and indicate that the mammoth died when she inhaled mud and choked to death.

Lyuba's permanent home is the Shemanovskiy Museum and Exhibition Center in Salekhard, Russia.

Lyuba was the subject of a 2009 documentary Waking the Baby Mammoth by the National Geographic Channel and of a 2011 children's book by Christopher Sloan, Baby Mammoth Mummy: Frozen in Time: A Prehistoric Animal's Journey into the 21st Century.

== See also ==
- Adams' Mammoth
- Jarkov Mammoth
- List of mammoth specimens
- Sopkarga Mammoth (Zhenya)
- Yuka Mammoth
- Yukagir Mammoth
